

541001–541100 

|-bgcolor=#fefefe
| 541001 ||  || — || January 17, 2015 || Kitt Peak || Spacewatch ||  || align=right data-sort-value="0.72" | 720 m || 
|-id=002 bgcolor=#fefefe
| 541002 ||  || — || October 7, 2004 || Kitt Peak || Spacewatch ||  || align=right data-sort-value="0.46" | 460 m || 
|-id=003 bgcolor=#E9E9E9
| 541003 ||  || — || November 30, 2005 || Kitt Peak || Spacewatch ||  || align=right | 1.3 km || 
|-id=004 bgcolor=#E9E9E9
| 541004 ||  || — || October 23, 2004 || Kitt Peak || Spacewatch ||  || align=right | 1.5 km || 
|-id=005 bgcolor=#fefefe
| 541005 ||  || — || March 18, 2009 || Kitt Peak || Spacewatch ||  || align=right | 1.2 km || 
|-id=006 bgcolor=#E9E9E9
| 541006 ||  || — || May 29, 2012 || Mount Lemmon || Mount Lemmon Survey ||  || align=right | 1.3 km || 
|-id=007 bgcolor=#d6d6d6
| 541007 ||  || — || January 13, 2008 || Kitt Peak || Spacewatch ||  || align=right | 2.5 km || 
|-id=008 bgcolor=#d6d6d6
| 541008 ||  || — || March 24, 2014 || Haleakala || Pan-STARRS ||  || align=right | 2.5 km || 
|-id=009 bgcolor=#E9E9E9
| 541009 ||  || — || April 25, 2015 || Haleakala || Pan-STARRS ||  || align=right | 1.1 km || 
|-id=010 bgcolor=#d6d6d6
| 541010 ||  || — || August 10, 2010 || Kitt Peak || Spacewatch || 7:4 || align=right | 3.1 km || 
|-id=011 bgcolor=#d6d6d6
| 541011 ||  || — || February 1, 2009 || Kitt Peak || Spacewatch ||  || align=right | 2.9 km || 
|-id=012 bgcolor=#d6d6d6
| 541012 ||  || — || November 26, 2012 || Mount Lemmon || Mount Lemmon Survey ||  || align=right | 2.9 km || 
|-id=013 bgcolor=#E9E9E9
| 541013 ||  || — || March 20, 2010 || WISE || WISE ||  || align=right | 2.3 km || 
|-id=014 bgcolor=#d6d6d6
| 541014 ||  || — || May 28, 2008 || Mount Lemmon || Mount Lemmon Survey ||  || align=right | 3.1 km || 
|-id=015 bgcolor=#E9E9E9
| 541015 ||  || — || January 13, 1996 || Kitt Peak || Spacewatch ||  || align=right | 2.1 km || 
|-id=016 bgcolor=#E9E9E9
| 541016 ||  || — || September 27, 2008 || Catalina || CSS ||  || align=right | 1.6 km || 
|-id=017 bgcolor=#d6d6d6
| 541017 ||  || — || February 22, 2010 || WISE || WISE ||  || align=right | 3.8 km || 
|-id=018 bgcolor=#E9E9E9
| 541018 ||  || — || May 16, 2010 || WISE || WISE ||  || align=right | 1.4 km || 
|-id=019 bgcolor=#d6d6d6
| 541019 ||  || — || October 19, 2011 || Catalina || CSS ||  || align=right | 3.6 km || 
|-id=020 bgcolor=#E9E9E9
| 541020 ||  || — || May 4, 2005 || Kitt Peak || Spacewatch ||  || align=right | 2.5 km || 
|-id=021 bgcolor=#fefefe
| 541021 ||  || — || September 25, 2009 || Mount Lemmon || Mount Lemmon Survey ||  || align=right data-sort-value="0.97" | 970 m || 
|-id=022 bgcolor=#d6d6d6
| 541022 ||  || — || April 19, 2015 || Kitt Peak || Spacewatch ||  || align=right | 3.0 km || 
|-id=023 bgcolor=#fefefe
| 541023 ||  || — || February 1, 2005 || Kitt Peak || Spacewatch ||  || align=right data-sort-value="0.91" | 910 m || 
|-id=024 bgcolor=#E9E9E9
| 541024 ||  || — || September 4, 2008 || Kitt Peak || Spacewatch ||  || align=right | 1.7 km || 
|-id=025 bgcolor=#E9E9E9
| 541025 ||  || — || October 18, 1996 || Kitt Peak || Spacewatch ||  || align=right | 1.4 km || 
|-id=026 bgcolor=#d6d6d6
| 541026 ||  || — || August 6, 2005 || Siding Spring || SSS ||  || align=right | 4.5 km || 
|-id=027 bgcolor=#E9E9E9
| 541027 ||  || — || September 11, 2004 || Socorro || LINEAR ||  || align=right | 3.3 km || 
|-id=028 bgcolor=#E9E9E9
| 541028 ||  || — || August 11, 2004 || Campo Imperatore || CINEOS ||  || align=right | 1.1 km || 
|-id=029 bgcolor=#E9E9E9
| 541029 ||  || — || March 23, 2010 || WISE || WISE ||  || align=right | 2.7 km || 
|-id=030 bgcolor=#E9E9E9
| 541030 ||  || — || October 15, 2012 || Haleakala || Pan-STARRS ||  || align=right | 1.3 km || 
|-id=031 bgcolor=#E9E9E9
| 541031 ||  || — || December 21, 2000 || Kitt Peak || Spacewatch ||  || align=right | 1.6 km || 
|-id=032 bgcolor=#E9E9E9
| 541032 ||  || — || October 20, 2012 || Haleakala || Pan-STARRS ||  || align=right | 2.1 km || 
|-id=033 bgcolor=#fefefe
| 541033 ||  || — || October 13, 2006 || Kitt Peak || Spacewatch ||  || align=right data-sort-value="0.99" | 990 m || 
|-id=034 bgcolor=#d6d6d6
| 541034 ||  || — || July 27, 2009 || Catalina || CSS ||  || align=right | 3.4 km || 
|-id=035 bgcolor=#E9E9E9
| 541035 ||  || — || December 3, 2012 || Mount Lemmon || Mount Lemmon Survey ||  || align=right | 2.4 km || 
|-id=036 bgcolor=#E9E9E9
| 541036 ||  || — || August 27, 2006 || Kitt Peak || Spacewatch ||  || align=right | 2.4 km || 
|-id=037 bgcolor=#E9E9E9
| 541037 ||  || — || May 21, 2006 || Catalina || CSS ||  || align=right | 4.0 km || 
|-id=038 bgcolor=#d6d6d6
| 541038 ||  || — || July 25, 2010 || WISE || WISE ||  || align=right | 4.2 km || 
|-id=039 bgcolor=#d6d6d6
| 541039 ||  || — || October 1, 2005 || Anderson Mesa || LONEOS ||  || align=right | 4.1 km || 
|-id=040 bgcolor=#d6d6d6
| 541040 ||  || — || September 18, 2010 || Mount Lemmon || Mount Lemmon Survey ||  || align=right | 3.7 km || 
|-id=041 bgcolor=#d6d6d6
| 541041 ||  || — || September 26, 2011 || Haleakala || Pan-STARRS ||  || align=right | 2.3 km || 
|-id=042 bgcolor=#E9E9E9
| 541042 ||  || — || April 13, 2010 || Catalina || CSS ||  || align=right | 2.9 km || 
|-id=043 bgcolor=#d6d6d6
| 541043 ||  || — || December 25, 2011 || Kitt Peak || Spacewatch ||  || align=right | 4.1 km || 
|-id=044 bgcolor=#d6d6d6
| 541044 ||  || — || March 11, 2008 || Mount Lemmon || Mount Lemmon Survey ||  || align=right | 2.4 km || 
|-id=045 bgcolor=#d6d6d6
| 541045 ||  || — || July 1, 2014 || Haleakala || Pan-STARRS ||  || align=right | 2.2 km || 
|-id=046 bgcolor=#E9E9E9
| 541046 ||  || — || December 27, 2003 || Kitt Peak || Spacewatch ||  || align=right | 3.2 km || 
|-id=047 bgcolor=#E9E9E9
| 541047 ||  || — || February 9, 2005 || Anderson Mesa || LONEOS ||  || align=right | 2.0 km || 
|-id=048 bgcolor=#fefefe
| 541048 ||  || — || September 12, 2009 || Kitt Peak || Spacewatch ||  || align=right data-sort-value="0.79" | 790 m || 
|-id=049 bgcolor=#E9E9E9
| 541049 ||  || — || March 9, 2005 || Kitt Peak || Spacewatch ||  || align=right | 2.0 km || 
|-id=050 bgcolor=#E9E9E9
| 541050 ||  || — || January 19, 2005 || Kitt Peak || Spacewatch ||  || align=right | 1.7 km || 
|-id=051 bgcolor=#E9E9E9
| 541051 ||  || — || January 18, 2009 || Socorro || LINEAR ||  || align=right | 2.2 km || 
|-id=052 bgcolor=#E9E9E9
| 541052 ||  || — || June 23, 2010 || WISE || WISE ||  || align=right | 4.0 km || 
|-id=053 bgcolor=#E9E9E9
| 541053 ||  || — || April 4, 2014 || Mount Lemmon || Mount Lemmon Survey ||  || align=right | 1.5 km || 
|-id=054 bgcolor=#d6d6d6
| 541054 ||  || — || February 25, 2007 || Catalina || CSS ||  || align=right | 4.2 km || 
|-id=055 bgcolor=#E9E9E9
| 541055 ||  || — || February 11, 2002 || Socorro || LINEAR ||  || align=right | 1.3 km || 
|-id=056 bgcolor=#E9E9E9
| 541056 ||  || — || January 19, 2009 || Mount Lemmon || Mount Lemmon Survey ||  || align=right | 2.7 km || 
|-id=057 bgcolor=#d6d6d6
| 541057 ||  || — || May 22, 2003 || Kitt Peak || Spacewatch ||  || align=right | 4.2 km || 
|-id=058 bgcolor=#d6d6d6
| 541058 ||  || — || November 22, 2011 || Mount Lemmon || Mount Lemmon Survey ||  || align=right | 2.9 km || 
|-id=059 bgcolor=#E9E9E9
| 541059 ||  || — || December 1, 2008 || Mount Lemmon || Mount Lemmon Survey ||  || align=right | 1.4 km || 
|-id=060 bgcolor=#fefefe
| 541060 ||  || — || February 16, 2007 || Catalina || CSS || H || align=right data-sort-value="0.94" | 940 m || 
|-id=061 bgcolor=#d6d6d6
| 541061 ||  || — || June 29, 2010 || WISE || WISE ||  || align=right | 3.1 km || 
|-id=062 bgcolor=#d6d6d6
| 541062 ||  || — || April 12, 2010 || WISE || WISE ||  || align=right | 3.1 km || 
|-id=063 bgcolor=#E9E9E9
| 541063 ||  || — || September 3, 2008 || Kitt Peak || Spacewatch ||  || align=right | 1.3 km || 
|-id=064 bgcolor=#d6d6d6
| 541064 ||  || — || February 9, 2007 || Catalina || CSS ||  || align=right | 3.2 km || 
|-id=065 bgcolor=#fefefe
| 541065 ||  || — || December 7, 2005 || Catalina || CSS ||  || align=right | 2.1 km || 
|-id=066 bgcolor=#fefefe
| 541066 ||  || — || January 15, 2002 || Socorro || LINEAR || H || align=right data-sort-value="0.94" | 940 m || 
|-id=067 bgcolor=#FA8072
| 541067 ||  || — || September 16, 2003 || Kitt Peak || Spacewatch ||  || align=right data-sort-value="0.54" | 540 m || 
|-id=068 bgcolor=#d6d6d6
| 541068 ||  || — || March 30, 2010 || WISE || WISE ||  || align=right | 7.1 km || 
|-id=069 bgcolor=#d6d6d6
| 541069 ||  || — || January 2, 2009 || Kitt Peak || Spacewatch || Tj (2.99) || align=right | 5.7 km || 
|-id=070 bgcolor=#E9E9E9
| 541070 ||  || — || January 27, 2004 || Kitt Peak || Spacewatch ||  || align=right | 1.3 km || 
|-id=071 bgcolor=#FA8072
| 541071 ||  || — || September 25, 2005 || Catalina || CSS ||  || align=right data-sort-value="0.56" | 560 m || 
|-id=072 bgcolor=#fefefe
| 541072 ||  || — || September 29, 2003 || Kitt Peak || Spacewatch ||  || align=right | 1.5 km || 
|-id=073 bgcolor=#FA8072
| 541073 ||  || — || February 25, 2011 || Mount Lemmon || Mount Lemmon Survey ||  || align=right | 3.1 km || 
|-id=074 bgcolor=#d6d6d6
| 541074 ||  || — || September 29, 2003 || Anderson Mesa || LONEOS ||  || align=right | 3.4 km || 
|-id=075 bgcolor=#d6d6d6
| 541075 ||  || — || October 23, 2008 || Kitt Peak || Spacewatch ||  || align=right | 5.1 km || 
|-id=076 bgcolor=#d6d6d6
| 541076 ||  || — || May 2, 2006 || Mount Lemmon || Mount Lemmon Survey ||  || align=right | 2.9 km || 
|-id=077 bgcolor=#E9E9E9
| 541077 ||  || — || January 11, 2008 || Mount Lemmon || Mount Lemmon Survey ||  || align=right | 3.3 km || 
|-id=078 bgcolor=#E9E9E9
| 541078 ||  || — || September 3, 2014 || Catalina || CSS ||  || align=right | 1.2 km || 
|-id=079 bgcolor=#E9E9E9
| 541079 ||  || — || November 6, 2010 || Mount Lemmon || Mount Lemmon Survey ||  || align=right | 2.9 km || 
|-id=080 bgcolor=#d6d6d6
| 541080 ||  || — || October 18, 2007 || Anderson Mesa || LONEOS ||  || align=right | 3.7 km || 
|-id=081 bgcolor=#d6d6d6
| 541081 ||  || — || December 31, 2002 || Socorro || LINEAR ||  || align=right | 4.4 km || 
|-id=082 bgcolor=#E9E9E9
| 541082 ||  || — || October 13, 2009 || La Sagra || OAM Obs. ||  || align=right | 1.8 km || 
|-id=083 bgcolor=#d6d6d6
| 541083 ||  || — || November 1, 2008 || Mount Lemmon || Mount Lemmon Survey ||  || align=right | 2.9 km || 
|-id=084 bgcolor=#fefefe
| 541084 ||  || — || December 3, 2008 || Kitt Peak || Spacewatch ||  || align=right data-sort-value="0.67" | 670 m || 
|-id=085 bgcolor=#fefefe
| 541085 ||  || — || September 28, 2011 || Kitt Peak || Spacewatch ||  || align=right data-sort-value="0.75" | 750 m || 
|-id=086 bgcolor=#E9E9E9
| 541086 ||  || — || January 26, 2012 || Haleakala || Pan-STARRS ||  || align=right | 1.3 km || 
|-id=087 bgcolor=#d6d6d6
| 541087 ||  || — || November 19, 2003 || Kitt Peak || Spacewatch ||  || align=right | 2.2 km || 
|-id=088 bgcolor=#d6d6d6
| 541088 ||  || — || October 8, 2007 || Catalina || CSS ||  || align=right | 2.9 km || 
|-id=089 bgcolor=#E9E9E9
| 541089 ||  || — || May 21, 2005 || Mount Lemmon || Mount Lemmon Survey ||  || align=right | 1.6 km || 
|-id=090 bgcolor=#E9E9E9
| 541090 ||  || — || December 8, 2010 || Mount Lemmon || Mount Lemmon Survey ||  || align=right | 1.1 km || 
|-id=091 bgcolor=#fefefe
| 541091 ||  || — || November 1, 2000 || Socorro || LINEAR ||  || align=right data-sort-value="0.62" | 620 m || 
|-id=092 bgcolor=#E9E9E9
| 541092 ||  || — || December 11, 2006 || Kitt Peak || Spacewatch ||  || align=right | 1.2 km || 
|-id=093 bgcolor=#FA8072
| 541093 ||  || — || September 2, 2003 || Socorro || LINEAR ||  || align=right data-sort-value="0.94" | 940 m || 
|-id=094 bgcolor=#fefefe
| 541094 ||  || — || May 11, 2004 || Siding Spring || SSS || H || align=right data-sort-value="0.88" | 880 m || 
|-id=095 bgcolor=#E9E9E9
| 541095 ||  || — || April 25, 2003 || Kitt Peak || Spacewatch ||  || align=right | 1.9 km || 
|-id=096 bgcolor=#fefefe
| 541096 ||  || — || October 6, 2008 || Mount Lemmon || Mount Lemmon Survey ||  || align=right data-sort-value="0.63" | 630 m || 
|-id=097 bgcolor=#fefefe
| 541097 ||  || — || September 12, 2004 || Socorro || LINEAR ||  || align=right data-sort-value="0.88" | 880 m || 
|-id=098 bgcolor=#fefefe
| 541098 ||  || — || April 16, 2007 || Mount Lemmon || Mount Lemmon Survey || H || align=right data-sort-value="0.60" | 600 m || 
|-id=099 bgcolor=#fefefe
| 541099 ||  || — || November 20, 2003 || Socorro || LINEAR ||  || align=right | 2.1 km || 
|-id=100 bgcolor=#E9E9E9
| 541100 ||  || — || October 28, 2005 || Mount Lemmon || Mount Lemmon Survey ||  || align=right | 2.1 km || 
|}

541101–541200 

|-bgcolor=#E9E9E9
| 541101 ||  || — || October 1, 2010 || La Sagra || OAM Obs. ||  || align=right data-sort-value="0.86" | 860 m || 
|-id=102 bgcolor=#d6d6d6
| 541102 ||  || — || September 5, 2007 || Catalina || CSS ||  || align=right | 2.8 km || 
|-id=103 bgcolor=#d6d6d6
| 541103 ||  || — || August 8, 2012 || Haleakala || Pan-STARRS ||  || align=right | 4.2 km || 
|-id=104 bgcolor=#fefefe
| 541104 ||  || — || May 5, 2010 || Mount Lemmon || Mount Lemmon Survey ||  || align=right | 1.1 km || 
|-id=105 bgcolor=#E9E9E9
| 541105 ||  || — || October 27, 2005 || Catalina || CSS ||  || align=right | 1.1 km || 
|-id=106 bgcolor=#E9E9E9
| 541106 ||  || — || October 23, 2006 || Mount Lemmon || Mount Lemmon Survey ||  || align=right data-sort-value="0.82" | 820 m || 
|-id=107 bgcolor=#E9E9E9
| 541107 ||  || — || October 27, 2009 || Mount Lemmon || Mount Lemmon Survey ||  || align=right | 2.3 km || 
|-id=108 bgcolor=#d6d6d6
| 541108 ||  || — || May 17, 2010 || WISE || WISE ||  || align=right | 2.4 km || 
|-id=109 bgcolor=#fefefe
| 541109 ||  || — || September 22, 2003 || Anderson Mesa || LONEOS ||  || align=right data-sort-value="0.75" | 750 m || 
|-id=110 bgcolor=#fefefe
| 541110 ||  || — || April 10, 2010 || WISE || WISE ||  || align=right | 3.0 km || 
|-id=111 bgcolor=#fefefe
| 541111 ||  || — || August 31, 2000 || Socorro || LINEAR ||  || align=right data-sort-value="0.78" | 780 m || 
|-id=112 bgcolor=#d6d6d6
| 541112 ||  || — || May 21, 2006 || Kitt Peak || Spacewatch ||  || align=right | 3.4 km || 
|-id=113 bgcolor=#d6d6d6
| 541113 ||  || — || September 12, 2007 || Mount Lemmon || Mount Lemmon Survey ||  || align=right | 4.6 km || 
|-id=114 bgcolor=#fefefe
| 541114 ||  || — || July 19, 2007 || Mount Lemmon || Mount Lemmon Survey ||  || align=right data-sort-value="0.86" | 860 m || 
|-id=115 bgcolor=#E9E9E9
| 541115 ||  || — || March 15, 2012 || Mount Lemmon || Mount Lemmon Survey ||  || align=right | 1.6 km || 
|-id=116 bgcolor=#fefefe
| 541116 ||  || — || March 12, 2010 || Kitt Peak || Spacewatch ||  || align=right data-sort-value="0.94" | 940 m || 
|-id=117 bgcolor=#fefefe
| 541117 ||  || — || October 1, 2000 || Socorro || LINEAR ||  || align=right data-sort-value="0.89" | 890 m || 
|-id=118 bgcolor=#fefefe
| 541118 ||  || — || November 17, 1995 || Kitt Peak || Spacewatch ||  || align=right data-sort-value="0.97" | 970 m || 
|-id=119 bgcolor=#d6d6d6
| 541119 ||  || — || September 12, 2007 || Catalina || CSS ||  || align=right | 3.1 km || 
|-id=120 bgcolor=#fefefe
| 541120 ||  || — || May 7, 2014 || Haleakala || Pan-STARRS ||  || align=right | 1.2 km || 
|-id=121 bgcolor=#fefefe
| 541121 ||  || — || May 12, 2007 || Mount Lemmon || Mount Lemmon Survey ||  || align=right | 1.0 km || 
|-id=122 bgcolor=#FA8072
| 541122 ||  || — || August 26, 2000 || Socorro || LINEAR || H || align=right data-sort-value="0.59" | 590 m || 
|-id=123 bgcolor=#fefefe
| 541123 ||  || — || September 23, 2011 || Mount Lemmon || Mount Lemmon Survey ||  || align=right data-sort-value="0.71" | 710 m || 
|-id=124 bgcolor=#E9E9E9
| 541124 ||  || — || November 8, 2010 || Mount Lemmon || Mount Lemmon Survey ||  || align=right | 1.0 km || 
|-id=125 bgcolor=#d6d6d6
| 541125 ||  || — || September 11, 2007 || XuYi || PMO NEO ||  || align=right | 3.1 km || 
|-id=126 bgcolor=#fefefe
| 541126 ||  || — || January 2, 2012 || Mount Lemmon || Mount Lemmon Survey ||  || align=right data-sort-value="0.91" | 910 m || 
|-id=127 bgcolor=#d6d6d6
| 541127 ||  || — || April 11, 2011 || Mount Lemmon || Mount Lemmon Survey ||  || align=right | 3.2 km || 
|-id=128 bgcolor=#d6d6d6
| 541128 ||  || — || August 30, 2008 || La Sagra || OAM Obs. ||  || align=right | 4.1 km || 
|-id=129 bgcolor=#fefefe
| 541129 ||  || — || March 27, 1995 || Kitt Peak || Spacewatch ||  || align=right data-sort-value="0.74" | 740 m || 
|-id=130 bgcolor=#E9E9E9
| 541130 ||  || — || January 26, 2003 || Kitt Peak || Spacewatch ||  || align=right | 2.4 km || 
|-id=131 bgcolor=#fefefe
| 541131 ||  || — || September 9, 2004 || Socorro || LINEAR ||  || align=right data-sort-value="0.85" | 850 m || 
|-id=132 bgcolor=#C2E0FF
| 541132 Leleākūhonua ||  ||  || October 13, 2015 || Mauna Kea || D. J. Tholen, C. Trujillo, S. S. Sheppard || sednoid || align=right | 110 km || 
|-id=133 bgcolor=#d6d6d6
| 541133 ||  || — || August 18, 2002 || Palomar || NEAT ||  || align=right | 3.4 km || 
|-id=134 bgcolor=#d6d6d6
| 541134 ||  || — || September 15, 2002 || Palomar || NEAT ||  || align=right | 3.5 km || 
|-id=135 bgcolor=#E9E9E9
| 541135 ||  || — || November 4, 2002 || Kitt Peak || Spacewatch ||  || align=right | 1.8 km || 
|-id=136 bgcolor=#d6d6d6
| 541136 ||  || — || November 18, 2003 || Palomar || NEAT ||  || align=right | 4.8 km || 
|-id=137 bgcolor=#d6d6d6
| 541137 ||  || — || December 11, 2004 || Campo Imperator || CINEOS ||  || align=right | 4.0 km || 
|-id=138 bgcolor=#d6d6d6
| 541138 ||  || — || September 13, 2002 || Palomar || NEAT || EOS || align=right | 2.3 km || 
|-id=139 bgcolor=#E9E9E9
| 541139 ||  || — || August 5, 2005 || Palomar || NEAT ||  || align=right | 2.4 km || 
|-id=140 bgcolor=#E9E9E9
| 541140 ||  || — || October 20, 2003 || Kitt Peak || Spacewatch ||  || align=right | 1.3 km || 
|-id=141 bgcolor=#E9E9E9
| 541141 ||  || — || September 1, 2002 || Palomar || NEAT ||  || align=right | 1.4 km || 
|-id=142 bgcolor=#E9E9E9
| 541142 ||  || — || April 15, 2013 || Elena Remote || A. Oreshko ||  || align=right | 1.6 km || 
|-id=143 bgcolor=#E9E9E9
| 541143 ||  || — || January 30, 2004 || Kitt Peak || Spacewatch ||  || align=right | 2.1 km || 
|-id=144 bgcolor=#d6d6d6
| 541144 ||  || — || March 18, 2002 || Kitt Peak || M. W. Buie, D. E. Trilling ||  || align=right | 2.3 km || 
|-id=145 bgcolor=#E9E9E9
| 541145 ||  || — || April 5, 2008 || Črni Vrh || H. Mikuž ||  || align=right | 2.7 km || 
|-id=146 bgcolor=#d6d6d6
| 541146 ||  || — || September 19, 2003 || Kitt Peak || Spacewatch || EOS || align=right | 2.6 km || 
|-id=147 bgcolor=#fefefe
| 541147 ||  || — || January 27, 2003 || Palomar || NEAT ||  || align=right | 1.1 km || 
|-id=148 bgcolor=#E9E9E9
| 541148 ||  || — || January 26, 2007 || Kitt Peak || Spacewatch ||  || align=right | 2.3 km || 
|-id=149 bgcolor=#d6d6d6
| 541149 ||  || — || August 22, 2003 || Palomar || NEAT ||  || align=right | 3.0 km || 
|-id=150 bgcolor=#E9E9E9
| 541150 ||  || — || May 19, 2002 || Palomar || NEAT ||  || align=right | 1.1 km || 
|-id=151 bgcolor=#d6d6d6
| 541151 ||  || — || January 5, 2006 || Mount Lemmon || Mount Lemmon Survey ||  || align=right | 3.4 km || 
|-id=152 bgcolor=#d6d6d6
| 541152 ||  || — || October 24, 2005 || Mauna Kea || D. J. Tholen ||  || align=right | 3.0 km || 
|-id=153 bgcolor=#E9E9E9
| 541153 ||  || — || October 19, 2006 || Mount Lemmon || Mount Lemmon Survey ||  || align=right | 1.6 km || 
|-id=154 bgcolor=#E9E9E9
| 541154 ||  || — || August 30, 2005 || Kitt Peak || Spacewatch ||  || align=right | 2.7 km || 
|-id=155 bgcolor=#E9E9E9
| 541155 ||  || — || July 28, 2006 || Siding Spring || SSS ||  || align=right | 1.7 km || 
|-id=156 bgcolor=#E9E9E9
| 541156 ||  || — || March 10, 2007 || Kitt Peak || Spacewatch ||  || align=right | 2.2 km || 
|-id=157 bgcolor=#E9E9E9
| 541157 ||  || — || August 15, 2009 || Catalina || CSS ||  || align=right | 2.0 km || 
|-id=158 bgcolor=#d6d6d6
| 541158 ||  || — || January 8, 2011 || Kitt Peak || Spacewatch ||  || align=right | 2.5 km || 
|-id=159 bgcolor=#E9E9E9
| 541159 ||  || — || December 8, 2010 || Catalina || CSS ||  || align=right | 2.7 km || 
|-id=160 bgcolor=#d6d6d6
| 541160 ||  || — || March 13, 2007 || Mount Lemmon || Mount Lemmon Survey ||  || align=right | 2.5 km || 
|-id=161 bgcolor=#d6d6d6
| 541161 ||  || — || December 14, 2010 || Mount Lemmon || Mount Lemmon Survey ||  || align=right | 1.9 km || 
|-id=162 bgcolor=#d6d6d6
| 541162 ||  || — || December 8, 2010 || Mount Lemmon || Mount Lemmon Survey ||  || align=right | 3.9 km || 
|-id=163 bgcolor=#E9E9E9
| 541163 ||  || — || November 15, 2010 || Mount Lemmon || Mount Lemmon Survey ||  || align=right | 2.3 km || 
|-id=164 bgcolor=#d6d6d6
| 541164 ||  || — || January 13, 2011 || Mount Lemmon || Mount Lemmon Survey ||  || align=right | 1.6 km || 
|-id=165 bgcolor=#d6d6d6
| 541165 ||  || — || December 9, 2010 || Mount Lemmon || Mount Lemmon Survey ||  || align=right | 2.2 km || 
|-id=166 bgcolor=#d6d6d6
| 541166 ||  || — || January 13, 2011 || Mount Lemmon || Mount Lemmon Survey ||  || align=right | 2.0 km || 
|-id=167 bgcolor=#fefefe
| 541167 ||  || — || January 3, 2011 || Mount Lemmon || Mount Lemmon Survey ||  || align=right data-sort-value="0.68" | 680 m || 
|-id=168 bgcolor=#E9E9E9
| 541168 ||  || — || February 21, 2007 || Mount Lemmon || Mount Lemmon Survey ||  || align=right | 2.2 km || 
|-id=169 bgcolor=#E9E9E9
| 541169 ||  || — || December 13, 2010 || Mount Lemmon || Mount Lemmon Survey ||  || align=right | 3.0 km || 
|-id=170 bgcolor=#E9E9E9
| 541170 ||  || — || January 5, 2002 || Anderson Mesa || LONEOS ||  || align=right | 2.9 km || 
|-id=171 bgcolor=#d6d6d6
| 541171 ||  || — || April 24, 2012 || Haleakala || Pan-STARRS ||  || align=right | 2.7 km || 
|-id=172 bgcolor=#d6d6d6
| 541172 ||  || — || September 30, 2003 || Kitt Peak || Spacewatch ||  || align=right | 3.2 km || 
|-id=173 bgcolor=#d6d6d6
| 541173 ||  || — || January 3, 2011 || Mount Lemmon || Mount Lemmon Survey ||  || align=right | 1.9 km || 
|-id=174 bgcolor=#d6d6d6
| 541174 ||  || — || January 14, 2011 || Kitt Peak || Spacewatch ||  || align=right | 1.8 km || 
|-id=175 bgcolor=#fefefe
| 541175 ||  || — || January 10, 2011 || Mount Lemmon || Mount Lemmon Survey ||  || align=right data-sort-value="0.66" | 660 m || 
|-id=176 bgcolor=#d6d6d6
| 541176 ||  || — || November 15, 2010 || Mount Lemmon || Mount Lemmon Survey ||  || align=right | 2.6 km || 
|-id=177 bgcolor=#d6d6d6
| 541177 ||  || — || September 20, 2003 || Palomar || NEAT ||  || align=right | 3.6 km || 
|-id=178 bgcolor=#E9E9E9
| 541178 ||  || — || January 16, 2011 || Mount Lemmon || Mount Lemmon Survey ||  || align=right | 1.8 km || 
|-id=179 bgcolor=#d6d6d6
| 541179 ||  || — || January 16, 2011 || Mount Lemmon || Mount Lemmon Survey ||  || align=right | 1.7 km || 
|-id=180 bgcolor=#fefefe
| 541180 ||  || — || March 10, 2005 || Mount Lemmon || Mount Lemmon Survey ||  || align=right data-sort-value="0.57" | 570 m || 
|-id=181 bgcolor=#d6d6d6
| 541181 ||  || — || January 23, 2011 || Mount Lemmon || Mount Lemmon Survey ||  || align=right | 2.3 km || 
|-id=182 bgcolor=#d6d6d6
| 541182 ||  || — || January 28, 2011 || Mount Lemmon || Mount Lemmon Survey ||  || align=right | 1.9 km || 
|-id=183 bgcolor=#d6d6d6
| 541183 ||  || — || February 2, 2005 || Kitt Peak || Spacewatch ||  || align=right | 3.8 km || 
|-id=184 bgcolor=#fefefe
| 541184 ||  || — || January 30, 2011 || Piszkesteto || Z. Kuli, K. Sárneczky ||  || align=right data-sort-value="0.59" | 590 m || 
|-id=185 bgcolor=#d6d6d6
| 541185 ||  || — || January 30, 2011 || Piszkesteto || Z. Kuli, K. Sárneczky ||  || align=right | 2.4 km || 
|-id=186 bgcolor=#d6d6d6
| 541186 ||  || — || January 31, 2011 || Piszkesteto || Z. Kuli, K. Sárneczky ||  || align=right | 2.7 km || 
|-id=187 bgcolor=#d6d6d6
| 541187 ||  || — || January 31, 2011 || Piszkesteto || Z. Kuli, K. Sárneczky ||  || align=right | 3.1 km || 
|-id=188 bgcolor=#d6d6d6
| 541188 ||  || — || December 22, 2005 || Kitt Peak || Spacewatch ||  || align=right | 2.0 km || 
|-id=189 bgcolor=#d6d6d6
| 541189 ||  || — || September 25, 2009 || Kitt Peak || Spacewatch ||  || align=right | 1.9 km || 
|-id=190 bgcolor=#d6d6d6
| 541190 ||  || — || March 14, 2011 || Mount Lemmon || Mount Lemmon Survey ||  || align=right | 2.7 km || 
|-id=191 bgcolor=#d6d6d6
| 541191 ||  || — || October 18, 2009 || Mount Lemmon || Mount Lemmon Survey ||  || align=right | 1.8 km || 
|-id=192 bgcolor=#E9E9E9
| 541192 ||  || — || January 15, 2007 || Mauna Kea || Mauna Kea Obs. ||  || align=right | 1.5 km || 
|-id=193 bgcolor=#FA8072
| 541193 ||  || — || March 5, 1997 || Kitt Peak || Spacewatch ||  || align=right data-sort-value="0.70" | 700 m || 
|-id=194 bgcolor=#d6d6d6
| 541194 ||  || — || August 20, 2008 || Kitt Peak || Spacewatch ||  || align=right | 3.7 km || 
|-id=195 bgcolor=#d6d6d6
| 541195 ||  || — || March 5, 2006 || Kitt Peak || Spacewatch ||  || align=right | 2.4 km || 
|-id=196 bgcolor=#fefefe
| 541196 ||  || — || September 18, 2009 || Kitt Peak || Spacewatch ||  || align=right data-sort-value="0.82" | 820 m || 
|-id=197 bgcolor=#d6d6d6
| 541197 ||  || — || October 30, 2005 || Mount Lemmon || Mount Lemmon Survey ||  || align=right | 2.3 km || 
|-id=198 bgcolor=#d6d6d6
| 541198 ||  || — || January 28, 2011 || Mount Lemmon || Mount Lemmon Survey ||  || align=right | 2.1 km || 
|-id=199 bgcolor=#d6d6d6
| 541199 ||  || — || September 21, 2003 || Palomar || NEAT ||  || align=right | 3.1 km || 
|-id=200 bgcolor=#d6d6d6
| 541200 Komjádibéla ||  ||  || August 24, 2008 || Piszkesteto || K. Sárneczky || EOS || align=right | 1.4 km || 
|}

541201–541300 

|-bgcolor=#E9E9E9
| 541201 ||  || — || September 26, 2009 || Kitt Peak || Spacewatch ||  || align=right | 2.3 km || 
|-id=202 bgcolor=#E9E9E9
| 541202 ||  || — || October 28, 2005 || Mount Lemmon || Mount Lemmon Survey ||  || align=right | 2.7 km || 
|-id=203 bgcolor=#E9E9E9
| 541203 ||  || — || July 29, 2008 || Mount Lemmon || Mount Lemmon Survey ||  || align=right | 2.6 km || 
|-id=204 bgcolor=#d6d6d6
| 541204 ||  || — || June 10, 2007 || Kitt Peak || Spacewatch ||  || align=right | 2.9 km || 
|-id=205 bgcolor=#d6d6d6
| 541205 ||  || — || January 8, 2011 || Mount Lemmon || Mount Lemmon Survey ||  || align=right | 2.3 km || 
|-id=206 bgcolor=#d6d6d6
| 541206 ||  || — || January 29, 2011 || Mount Lemmon || Mount Lemmon Survey ||  || align=right | 2.1 km || 
|-id=207 bgcolor=#fefefe
| 541207 ||  || — || January 8, 2011 || Mount Lemmon || Mount Lemmon Survey ||  || align=right data-sort-value="0.80" | 800 m || 
|-id=208 bgcolor=#d6d6d6
| 541208 ||  || — || January 29, 2011 || Mount Lemmon || Mount Lemmon Survey ||  || align=right | 1.8 km || 
|-id=209 bgcolor=#E9E9E9
| 541209 ||  || — || September 17, 2009 || Kitt Peak || Spacewatch ||  || align=right | 1.8 km || 
|-id=210 bgcolor=#fefefe
| 541210 ||  || — || April 30, 2005 || Kitt Peak || Spacewatch ||  || align=right data-sort-value="0.59" | 590 m || 
|-id=211 bgcolor=#d6d6d6
| 541211 ||  || — || January 29, 2011 || Mount Lemmon || Mount Lemmon Survey ||  || align=right | 3.5 km || 
|-id=212 bgcolor=#E9E9E9
| 541212 ||  || — || October 13, 2010 || Catalina || CSS ||  || align=right | 1.3 km || 
|-id=213 bgcolor=#d6d6d6
| 541213 ||  || — || November 11, 2009 || Mount Lemmon || Mount Lemmon Survey ||  || align=right | 2.0 km || 
|-id=214 bgcolor=#E9E9E9
| 541214 ||  || — || January 29, 2011 || Mount Lemmon || Mount Lemmon Survey ||  || align=right | 1.7 km || 
|-id=215 bgcolor=#d6d6d6
| 541215 ||  || — || October 9, 2008 || Mount Lemmon || Mount Lemmon Survey ||  || align=right | 2.4 km || 
|-id=216 bgcolor=#d6d6d6
| 541216 ||  || — || September 17, 2003 || Kitt Peak || Spacewatch ||  || align=right | 2.1 km || 
|-id=217 bgcolor=#d6d6d6
| 541217 ||  || — || February 26, 2011 || Mount Lemmon || Mount Lemmon Survey ||  || align=right | 2.9 km || 
|-id=218 bgcolor=#d6d6d6
| 541218 ||  || — || January 25, 2011 || Mount Lemmon || Mount Lemmon Survey ||  || align=right | 2.7 km || 
|-id=219 bgcolor=#E9E9E9
| 541219 ||  || — || October 25, 2009 || Kitt Peak || Spacewatch ||  || align=right | 2.1 km || 
|-id=220 bgcolor=#d6d6d6
| 541220 ||  || — || February 2, 2011 || Piszkesteto || Z. Kuli, K. Sárneczky ||  || align=right | 2.4 km || 
|-id=221 bgcolor=#E9E9E9
| 541221 ||  || — || January 27, 2011 || Mount Lemmon || Mount Lemmon Survey ||  || align=right | 2.3 km || 
|-id=222 bgcolor=#d6d6d6
| 541222 ||  || — || December 2, 2005 || Kitt Peak || L. H. Wasserman, R. Millis ||  || align=right | 3.4 km || 
|-id=223 bgcolor=#E9E9E9
| 541223 ||  || — || September 29, 2009 || Mount Lemmon || Mount Lemmon Survey ||  || align=right | 2.1 km || 
|-id=224 bgcolor=#d6d6d6
| 541224 ||  || — || January 25, 2011 || Mount Lemmon || Mount Lemmon Survey ||  || align=right | 2.5 km || 
|-id=225 bgcolor=#d6d6d6
| 541225 ||  || — || January 29, 2006 || Bergisch Gladbach || Bergisch Gladbach Obs. ||  || align=right | 2.0 km || 
|-id=226 bgcolor=#d6d6d6
| 541226 ||  || — || January 28, 2011 || Mount Lemmon || Mount Lemmon Survey ||  || align=right | 2.0 km || 
|-id=227 bgcolor=#d6d6d6
| 541227 ||  || — || February 5, 2011 || Catalina || CSS ||  || align=right | 2.1 km || 
|-id=228 bgcolor=#d6d6d6
| 541228 ||  || — || February 8, 2011 || Mount Lemmon || Mount Lemmon Survey ||  || align=right | 1.9 km || 
|-id=229 bgcolor=#fefefe
| 541229 ||  || — || February 10, 2011 || Mount Lemmon || Mount Lemmon Survey ||  || align=right data-sort-value="0.62" | 620 m || 
|-id=230 bgcolor=#E9E9E9
| 541230 ||  || — || November 1, 2005 || Mount Lemmon || Mount Lemmon Survey ||  || align=right data-sort-value="0.92" | 920 m || 
|-id=231 bgcolor=#E9E9E9
| 541231 ||  || — || January 28, 2011 || Kitt Peak || Spacewatch ||  || align=right | 2.3 km || 
|-id=232 bgcolor=#d6d6d6
| 541232 ||  || — || December 13, 2010 || Mount Lemmon || Mount Lemmon Survey ||  || align=right | 2.3 km || 
|-id=233 bgcolor=#d6d6d6
| 541233 ||  || — || January 12, 2011 || Mount Lemmon || Mount Lemmon Survey ||  || align=right | 2.2 km || 
|-id=234 bgcolor=#fefefe
| 541234 ||  || — || August 7, 2012 || Mayhill-ISON || ISON ||  || align=right | 1.0 km || 
|-id=235 bgcolor=#d6d6d6
| 541235 ||  || — || February 10, 2011 || Mount Lemmon || Mount Lemmon Survey ||  || align=right | 2.4 km || 
|-id=236 bgcolor=#fefefe
| 541236 ||  || — || September 26, 2006 || Kitt Peak || Spacewatch ||  || align=right data-sort-value="0.62" | 620 m || 
|-id=237 bgcolor=#d6d6d6
| 541237 ||  || — || January 7, 2016 || Haleakala || Pan-STARRS ||  || align=right | 3.3 km || 
|-id=238 bgcolor=#d6d6d6
| 541238 ||  || — || February 11, 2011 || Mount Lemmon || Mount Lemmon Survey ||  || align=right | 2.3 km || 
|-id=239 bgcolor=#d6d6d6
| 541239 ||  || — || February 2, 2006 || Kitt Peak || Spacewatch ||  || align=right | 2.2 km || 
|-id=240 bgcolor=#E9E9E9
| 541240 ||  || — || August 12, 2013 || Haleakala || Pan-STARRS ||  || align=right | 1.9 km || 
|-id=241 bgcolor=#d6d6d6
| 541241 ||  || — || September 25, 2014 || Catalina || CSS ||  || align=right | 2.1 km || 
|-id=242 bgcolor=#d6d6d6
| 541242 ||  || — || September 16, 2003 || Kitt Peak || Spacewatch || EOS || align=right | 1.5 km || 
|-id=243 bgcolor=#d6d6d6
| 541243 ||  || — || February 5, 2011 || Haleakala || Pan-STARRS ||  || align=right | 2.3 km || 
|-id=244 bgcolor=#E9E9E9
| 541244 ||  || — || March 6, 2011 || Mount Lemmon || Mount Lemmon Survey ||  || align=right | 1.6 km || 
|-id=245 bgcolor=#d6d6d6
| 541245 ||  || — || September 20, 2014 || Haleakala || Pan-STARRS ||  || align=right | 2.2 km || 
|-id=246 bgcolor=#d6d6d6
| 541246 ||  || — || February 1, 2006 || Mount Lemmon || Mount Lemmon Survey ||  || align=right | 2.3 km || 
|-id=247 bgcolor=#d6d6d6
| 541247 ||  || — || September 18, 2009 || Mount Lemmon || Mount Lemmon Survey ||  || align=right | 2.1 km || 
|-id=248 bgcolor=#fefefe
| 541248 ||  || — || February 6, 2007 || Palomar || NEAT || V || align=right | 1.1 km || 
|-id=249 bgcolor=#d6d6d6
| 541249 ||  || — || February 27, 2006 || Mount Lemmon || Mount Lemmon Survey ||  || align=right | 2.2 km || 
|-id=250 bgcolor=#E9E9E9
| 541250 ||  || — || March 29, 2007 || Kitt Peak || Spacewatch ||  || align=right | 2.0 km || 
|-id=251 bgcolor=#E9E9E9
| 541251 ||  || — || January 11, 2011 || Mount Lemmon || Mount Lemmon Survey ||  || align=right | 2.2 km || 
|-id=252 bgcolor=#E9E9E9
| 541252 ||  || — || January 30, 2011 || Piszkesteto || Z. Kuli, K. Sárneczky ||  || align=right | 1.8 km || 
|-id=253 bgcolor=#fefefe
| 541253 ||  || — || January 26, 2011 || Kitt Peak || Spacewatch ||  || align=right data-sort-value="0.90" | 900 m || 
|-id=254 bgcolor=#d6d6d6
| 541254 ||  || — || February 25, 2011 || Mount Lemmon || Mount Lemmon Survey ||  || align=right | 2.8 km || 
|-id=255 bgcolor=#E9E9E9
| 541255 ||  || — || September 21, 2009 || Kitt Peak || Spacewatch ||  || align=right | 1.5 km || 
|-id=256 bgcolor=#d6d6d6
| 541256 ||  || — || September 28, 2003 || Anderson Mesa || LONEOS ||  || align=right | 4.6 km || 
|-id=257 bgcolor=#fefefe
| 541257 ||  || — || February 25, 2011 || Mount Lemmon || Mount Lemmon Survey ||  || align=right data-sort-value="0.62" | 620 m || 
|-id=258 bgcolor=#d6d6d6
| 541258 ||  || — || October 22, 2003 || Kitt Peak || Spacewatch ||  || align=right | 3.9 km || 
|-id=259 bgcolor=#d6d6d6
| 541259 ||  || — || February 25, 2011 || Mount Lemmon || Mount Lemmon Survey ||  || align=right | 2.1 km || 
|-id=260 bgcolor=#d6d6d6
| 541260 ||  || — || February 25, 2011 || Mount Lemmon || Mount Lemmon Survey ||  || align=right | 2.3 km || 
|-id=261 bgcolor=#d6d6d6
| 541261 ||  || — || February 25, 2011 || Mount Lemmon || Mount Lemmon Survey ||  || align=right | 2.4 km || 
|-id=262 bgcolor=#d6d6d6
| 541262 ||  || — || February 25, 2011 || Mount Lemmon || Mount Lemmon Survey ||  || align=right | 2.6 km || 
|-id=263 bgcolor=#d6d6d6
| 541263 ||  || — || February 26, 2011 || Mount Lemmon || Mount Lemmon Survey ||  || align=right | 3.0 km || 
|-id=264 bgcolor=#d6d6d6
| 541264 ||  || — || February 10, 2011 || Mount Lemmon || Mount Lemmon Survey ||  || align=right | 3.0 km || 
|-id=265 bgcolor=#d6d6d6
| 541265 ||  || — || January 15, 2005 || Kitt Peak || Spacewatch ||  || align=right | 2.3 km || 
|-id=266 bgcolor=#d6d6d6
| 541266 ||  || — || January 14, 2011 || Kitt Peak || Spacewatch ||  || align=right | 2.5 km || 
|-id=267 bgcolor=#fefefe
| 541267 ||  || — || May 18, 2005 || Palomar || NEAT ||  || align=right data-sort-value="0.74" | 740 m || 
|-id=268 bgcolor=#d6d6d6
| 541268 ||  || — || March 7, 2011 || Wildberg || Wildberg Obs. ||  || align=right | 3.3 km || 
|-id=269 bgcolor=#E9E9E9
| 541269 ||  || — || April 14, 2007 || Kitt Peak || Spacewatch ||  || align=right | 2.2 km || 
|-id=270 bgcolor=#d6d6d6
| 541270 ||  || — || February 26, 2011 || Catalina || CSS ||  || align=right | 1.9 km || 
|-id=271 bgcolor=#d6d6d6
| 541271 ||  || — || February 23, 2011 || Kitt Peak || Spacewatch ||  || align=right | 2.3 km || 
|-id=272 bgcolor=#d6d6d6
| 541272 ||  || — || March 2, 2011 || Kitt Peak || Spacewatch ||  || align=right | 2.2 km || 
|-id=273 bgcolor=#d6d6d6
| 541273 ||  || — || February 27, 2006 || Kitt Peak || Spacewatch ||  || align=right | 2.4 km || 
|-id=274 bgcolor=#d6d6d6
| 541274 ||  || — || March 6, 2011 || Kitt Peak || Spacewatch ||  || align=right | 2.8 km || 
|-id=275 bgcolor=#d6d6d6
| 541275 ||  || — || March 6, 2011 || Kitt Peak || Spacewatch ||  || align=right | 2.2 km || 
|-id=276 bgcolor=#d6d6d6
| 541276 ||  || — || March 9, 2011 || Kachina || Kachina Obs. ||  || align=right | 2.5 km || 
|-id=277 bgcolor=#d6d6d6
| 541277 ||  || — || March 6, 2011 || Mount Lemmon || Mount Lemmon Survey ||  || align=right | 2.2 km || 
|-id=278 bgcolor=#d6d6d6
| 541278 ||  || — || November 20, 2009 || Kitt Peak || Spacewatch ||  || align=right | 2.2 km || 
|-id=279 bgcolor=#d6d6d6
| 541279 ||  || — || November 1, 2008 || Mount Lemmon || Mount Lemmon Survey ||  || align=right | 3.7 km || 
|-id=280 bgcolor=#d6d6d6
| 541280 ||  || — || August 24, 2003 || Cerro Tololo || Cerro Tololo Obs. ||  || align=right | 2.7 km || 
|-id=281 bgcolor=#E9E9E9
| 541281 ||  || — || March 11, 2011 || Mayhill-ISON || ISON ||  || align=right | 1.8 km || 
|-id=282 bgcolor=#d6d6d6
| 541282 ||  || — || October 6, 2004 || Kitt Peak || Spacewatch ||  || align=right | 2.5 km || 
|-id=283 bgcolor=#d6d6d6
| 541283 ||  || — || March 12, 2011 || Mount Lemmon || Mount Lemmon Survey ||  || align=right | 2.8 km || 
|-id=284 bgcolor=#fefefe
| 541284 ||  || — || October 29, 2006 || Kitt Peak || Spacewatch ||  || align=right data-sort-value="0.59" | 590 m || 
|-id=285 bgcolor=#fefefe
| 541285 ||  || — || February 26, 2004 || Kitt Peak || M. W. Buie, D. E. Trilling ||  || align=right data-sort-value="0.59" | 590 m || 
|-id=286 bgcolor=#d6d6d6
| 541286 ||  || — || October 25, 2009 || Mount Lemmon || Mount Lemmon Survey ||  || align=right | 2.8 km || 
|-id=287 bgcolor=#d6d6d6
| 541287 ||  || — || September 24, 2008 || Mount Lemmon || Mount Lemmon Survey ||  || align=right | 3.4 km || 
|-id=288 bgcolor=#d6d6d6
| 541288 ||  || — || December 2, 2005 || Kitt Peak || L. H. Wasserman, R. Millis ||  || align=right | 2.3 km || 
|-id=289 bgcolor=#d6d6d6
| 541289 ||  || — || March 26, 2006 || Kitt Peak || Spacewatch ||  || align=right | 2.8 km || 
|-id=290 bgcolor=#d6d6d6
| 541290 ||  || — || September 24, 2008 || Kitt Peak || Spacewatch ||  || align=right | 2.4 km || 
|-id=291 bgcolor=#d6d6d6
| 541291 ||  || — || March 1, 2011 || Mount Lemmon || Mount Lemmon Survey ||  || align=right | 2.0 km || 
|-id=292 bgcolor=#d6d6d6
| 541292 ||  || — || March 24, 2011 || Nogales || Tenagra II Obs. ||  || align=right | 2.8 km || 
|-id=293 bgcolor=#E9E9E9
| 541293 ||  || — || March 24, 2011 || Kitt Peak || Spacewatch ||  || align=right | 2.1 km || 
|-id=294 bgcolor=#d6d6d6
| 541294 ||  || — || March 26, 2011 || Kitt Peak || Spacewatch ||  || align=right | 2.6 km || 
|-id=295 bgcolor=#fefefe
| 541295 ||  || — || March 27, 2011 || Mount Lemmon || Mount Lemmon Survey ||  || align=right data-sort-value="0.79" | 790 m || 
|-id=296 bgcolor=#d6d6d6
| 541296 ||  || — || March 26, 2011 || Mount Lemmon || Mount Lemmon Survey ||  || align=right | 3.1 km || 
|-id=297 bgcolor=#fefefe
| 541297 ||  || — || October 26, 2009 || Mount Lemmon || Mount Lemmon Survey ||  || align=right data-sort-value="0.71" | 710 m || 
|-id=298 bgcolor=#fefefe
| 541298 ||  || — || September 24, 2008 || Kitt Peak || Spacewatch ||  || align=right data-sort-value="0.82" | 820 m || 
|-id=299 bgcolor=#d6d6d6
| 541299 ||  || — || March 27, 2011 || Mount Lemmon || Mount Lemmon Survey ||  || align=right | 3.0 km || 
|-id=300 bgcolor=#d6d6d6
| 541300 ||  || — || December 19, 2004 || Kitt Peak || Spacewatch ||  || align=right | 2.5 km || 
|}

541301–541400 

|-bgcolor=#d6d6d6
| 541301 ||  || — || March 26, 2011 || Mount Lemmon || Mount Lemmon Survey ||  || align=right | 2.4 km || 
|-id=302 bgcolor=#d6d6d6
| 541302 ||  || — || March 13, 2011 || Mount Lemmon || Mount Lemmon Survey ||  || align=right | 2.9 km || 
|-id=303 bgcolor=#d6d6d6
| 541303 ||  || — || March 29, 2011 || Piszkesteto || Z. Kuli, K. Sárneczky ||  || align=right | 3.1 km || 
|-id=304 bgcolor=#d6d6d6
| 541304 ||  || — || March 29, 2011 || Piszkesteto || Z. Kuli, K. Sárneczky ||  || align=right | 2.7 km || 
|-id=305 bgcolor=#d6d6d6
| 541305 ||  || — || March 30, 2011 || Piszkesteto || Z. Kuli, K. Sárneczky ||  || align=right | 3.5 km || 
|-id=306 bgcolor=#d6d6d6
| 541306 ||  || — || March 5, 2006 || Anderson Mesa || LONEOS ||  || align=right | 4.0 km || 
|-id=307 bgcolor=#d6d6d6
| 541307 ||  || — || September 18, 2003 || Kitt Peak || Spacewatch ||  || align=right | 2.2 km || 
|-id=308 bgcolor=#d6d6d6
| 541308 ||  || — || April 10, 2005 || Kitt Peak || Kitt Peak Obs. ||  || align=right | 2.8 km || 
|-id=309 bgcolor=#d6d6d6
| 541309 ||  || — || April 30, 2006 || Kitt Peak || Spacewatch ||  || align=right | 2.8 km || 
|-id=310 bgcolor=#d6d6d6
| 541310 ||  || — || November 26, 2003 || Kitt Peak || Spacewatch ||  || align=right | 3.0 km || 
|-id=311 bgcolor=#d6d6d6
| 541311 ||  || — || December 18, 2004 || Mount Lemmon || Mount Lemmon Survey ||  || align=right | 3.6 km || 
|-id=312 bgcolor=#fefefe
| 541312 ||  || — || May 22, 2001 || Cerro Tololo || J. L. Elliot, L. H. Wasserman ||  || align=right data-sort-value="0.54" | 540 m || 
|-id=313 bgcolor=#d6d6d6
| 541313 ||  || — || March 29, 2011 || Kitt Peak || Spacewatch ||  || align=right | 2.6 km || 
|-id=314 bgcolor=#d6d6d6
| 541314 ||  || — || March 30, 2011 || Mount Lemmon || Mount Lemmon Survey ||  || align=right | 2.9 km || 
|-id=315 bgcolor=#fefefe
| 541315 ||  || — || March 28, 2011 || Kitt Peak || Spacewatch ||  || align=right data-sort-value="0.81" | 810 m || 
|-id=316 bgcolor=#d6d6d6
| 541316 ||  || — || May 31, 2001 || Kitt Peak || Spacewatch ||  || align=right | 2.6 km || 
|-id=317 bgcolor=#fefefe
| 541317 ||  || — || October 4, 1996 || Kitt Peak || Spacewatch ||  || align=right data-sort-value="0.75" | 750 m || 
|-id=318 bgcolor=#d6d6d6
| 541318 ||  || — || March 29, 2011 || Falera || Mirasteilas Obs. ||  || align=right | 2.3 km || 
|-id=319 bgcolor=#d6d6d6
| 541319 ||  || — || March 30, 2011 || Mount Lemmon || Mount Lemmon Survey ||  || align=right | 2.5 km || 
|-id=320 bgcolor=#d6d6d6
| 541320 ||  || — || September 30, 2003 || Kitt Peak || Spacewatch ||  || align=right | 2.1 km || 
|-id=321 bgcolor=#E9E9E9
| 541321 ||  || — || March 31, 2011 || Mount Lemmon || Mount Lemmon Survey ||  || align=right | 1.1 km || 
|-id=322 bgcolor=#d6d6d6
| 541322 ||  || — || March 27, 2011 || Mount Lemmon || Mount Lemmon Survey ||  || align=right | 2.2 km || 
|-id=323 bgcolor=#E9E9E9
| 541323 ||  || — || November 16, 2009 || Mount Lemmon || Mount Lemmon Survey ||  || align=right | 1.8 km || 
|-id=324 bgcolor=#d6d6d6
| 541324 ||  || — || March 1, 2011 || Mount Lemmon || Mount Lemmon Survey ||  || align=right | 2.3 km || 
|-id=325 bgcolor=#d6d6d6
| 541325 ||  || — || March 29, 2011 || Mount Lemmon || Mount Lemmon Survey ||  || align=right | 3.5 km || 
|-id=326 bgcolor=#d6d6d6
| 541326 ||  || — || September 20, 2008 || Mount Lemmon || Mount Lemmon Survey ||  || align=right | 2.0 km || 
|-id=327 bgcolor=#d6d6d6
| 541327 ||  || — || March 11, 2011 || Catalina || CSS ||  || align=right | 2.9 km || 
|-id=328 bgcolor=#d6d6d6
| 541328 ||  || — || March 27, 2011 || Mount Lemmon || Mount Lemmon Survey ||  || align=right | 3.7 km || 
|-id=329 bgcolor=#d6d6d6
| 541329 ||  || — || March 30, 2011 || Mount Lemmon || Mount Lemmon Survey ||  || align=right | 2.3 km || 
|-id=330 bgcolor=#d6d6d6
| 541330 ||  || — || March 26, 2011 || Mount Lemmon || Mount Lemmon Survey ||  || align=right | 3.7 km || 
|-id=331 bgcolor=#d6d6d6
| 541331 ||  || — || October 22, 2003 || Kitt Peak || Spacewatch ||  || align=right | 2.7 km || 
|-id=332 bgcolor=#d6d6d6
| 541332 ||  || — || November 23, 2009 || Kitt Peak || Spacewatch ||  || align=right | 2.8 km || 
|-id=333 bgcolor=#E9E9E9
| 541333 ||  || — || December 28, 2005 || Kitt Peak || Spacewatch ||  || align=right | 2.1 km || 
|-id=334 bgcolor=#d6d6d6
| 541334 ||  || — || February 23, 2011 || Kitt Peak || Spacewatch ||  || align=right | 2.7 km || 
|-id=335 bgcolor=#d6d6d6
| 541335 ||  || — || March 28, 2011 || Mount Lemmon || Mount Lemmon Survey ||  || align=right | 2.3 km || 
|-id=336 bgcolor=#d6d6d6
| 541336 ||  || — || October 8, 2008 || Kitt Peak || Spacewatch ||  || align=right | 2.4 km || 
|-id=337 bgcolor=#d6d6d6
| 541337 ||  || — || August 24, 2008 || Kitt Peak || Spacewatch ||  || align=right | 2.5 km || 
|-id=338 bgcolor=#d6d6d6
| 541338 ||  || — || March 30, 2011 || Mount Lemmon || Mount Lemmon Survey ||  || align=right | 2.0 km || 
|-id=339 bgcolor=#d6d6d6
| 541339 ||  || — || March 2, 2016 || Mount Lemmon || Mount Lemmon Survey ||  || align=right | 3.3 km || 
|-id=340 bgcolor=#d6d6d6
| 541340 ||  || — || July 30, 2008 || Mount Lemmon || Mount Lemmon Survey ||  || align=right | 2.7 km || 
|-id=341 bgcolor=#d6d6d6
| 541341 ||  || — || April 5, 2011 || Mount Lemmon || Mount Lemmon Survey ||  || align=right | 2.6 km || 
|-id=342 bgcolor=#d6d6d6
| 541342 ||  || — || September 3, 2008 || Kitt Peak || Spacewatch ||  || align=right | 2.2 km || 
|-id=343 bgcolor=#d6d6d6
| 541343 ||  || — || September 10, 2013 || Haleakala || Pan-STARRS ||  || align=right | 2.5 km || 
|-id=344 bgcolor=#d6d6d6
| 541344 ||  || — || September 23, 2008 || Kitt Peak || Spacewatch ||  || align=right | 2.3 km || 
|-id=345 bgcolor=#d6d6d6
| 541345 ||  || — || March 2, 2011 || Mount Lemmon || Mount Lemmon Survey ||  || align=right | 2.7 km || 
|-id=346 bgcolor=#d6d6d6
| 541346 ||  || — || November 2, 2008 || Mount Lemmon || Mount Lemmon Survey ||  || align=right | 2.4 km || 
|-id=347 bgcolor=#d6d6d6
| 541347 ||  || — || July 29, 2008 || Kitt Peak || Spacewatch ||  || align=right | 2.7 km || 
|-id=348 bgcolor=#d6d6d6
| 541348 ||  || — || September 26, 2013 || Catalina || CSS ||  || align=right | 3.3 km || 
|-id=349 bgcolor=#fefefe
| 541349 ||  || — || September 15, 2012 || Kitt Peak || Spacewatch ||  || align=right data-sort-value="0.79" | 790 m || 
|-id=350 bgcolor=#d6d6d6
| 541350 ||  || — || August 24, 2007 || Kitt Peak || Spacewatch ||  || align=right | 2.8 km || 
|-id=351 bgcolor=#E9E9E9
| 541351 ||  || — || April 12, 2002 || Palomar || NEAT ||  || align=right | 2.5 km || 
|-id=352 bgcolor=#d6d6d6
| 541352 ||  || — || March 11, 2011 || Catalina || CSS ||  || align=right | 2.8 km || 
|-id=353 bgcolor=#d6d6d6
| 541353 ||  || — || April 5, 2011 || Mount Lemmon || Mount Lemmon Survey ||  || align=right | 2.8 km || 
|-id=354 bgcolor=#d6d6d6
| 541354 ||  || — || August 9, 2013 || Haleakala || Pan-STARRS ||  || align=right | 2.2 km || 
|-id=355 bgcolor=#d6d6d6
| 541355 ||  || — || December 12, 2004 || Kitt Peak || Spacewatch ||  || align=right | 3.0 km || 
|-id=356 bgcolor=#d6d6d6
| 541356 ||  || — || September 5, 2008 || Kitt Peak || Spacewatch ||  || align=right | 3.1 km || 
|-id=357 bgcolor=#d6d6d6
| 541357 ||  || — || November 26, 2009 || Kitt Peak || Spacewatch ||  || align=right | 2.9 km || 
|-id=358 bgcolor=#d6d6d6
| 541358 ||  || — || November 17, 2014 || Haleakala || Pan-STARRS ||  || align=right | 2.3 km || 
|-id=359 bgcolor=#d6d6d6
| 541359 ||  || — || March 24, 2011 || Catalina || CSS ||  || align=right | 2.5 km || 
|-id=360 bgcolor=#fefefe
| 541360 ||  || — || March 9, 2011 || Mount Lemmon || Mount Lemmon Survey ||  || align=right data-sort-value="0.67" | 670 m || 
|-id=361 bgcolor=#d6d6d6
| 541361 ||  || — || March 6, 2011 || Mount Lemmon || Mount Lemmon Survey ||  || align=right | 2.5 km || 
|-id=362 bgcolor=#d6d6d6
| 541362 ||  || — || May 8, 2006 || Mount Lemmon || Mount Lemmon Survey ||  || align=right | 2.8 km || 
|-id=363 bgcolor=#d6d6d6
| 541363 ||  || — || March 11, 2011 || Mount Lemmon || Mount Lemmon Survey ||  || align=right | 2.3 km || 
|-id=364 bgcolor=#d6d6d6
| 541364 ||  || — || April 1, 2011 || Mount Lemmon || Mount Lemmon Survey ||  || align=right | 2.1 km || 
|-id=365 bgcolor=#d6d6d6
| 541365 ||  || — || October 1, 2008 || Mount Lemmon || Mount Lemmon Survey ||  || align=right | 3.1 km || 
|-id=366 bgcolor=#d6d6d6
| 541366 ||  || — || April 2, 2011 || Mount Lemmon || Mount Lemmon Survey ||  || align=right | 2.4 km || 
|-id=367 bgcolor=#d6d6d6
| 541367 ||  || — || November 8, 2008 || Kitt Peak || Spacewatch ||  || align=right | 3.3 km || 
|-id=368 bgcolor=#d6d6d6
| 541368 ||  || — || April 2, 2011 || Mount Lemmon || Mount Lemmon Survey ||  || align=right | 3.5 km || 
|-id=369 bgcolor=#d6d6d6
| 541369 ||  || — || April 2, 2011 || Mount Lemmon || Mount Lemmon Survey ||  || align=right | 3.2 km || 
|-id=370 bgcolor=#d6d6d6
| 541370 ||  || — || April 2, 2011 || Mount Lemmon || Mount Lemmon Survey ||  || align=right | 2.5 km || 
|-id=371 bgcolor=#d6d6d6
| 541371 ||  || — || September 29, 2008 || Catalina || CSS ||  || align=right | 3.1 km || 
|-id=372 bgcolor=#d6d6d6
| 541372 ||  || — || April 1, 2011 || Mount Lemmon || Mount Lemmon Survey ||  || align=right | 2.3 km || 
|-id=373 bgcolor=#fefefe
| 541373 ||  || — || April 1, 2011 || Mount Lemmon || Mount Lemmon Survey ||  || align=right data-sort-value="0.52" | 520 m || 
|-id=374 bgcolor=#d6d6d6
| 541374 ||  || — || March 16, 2005 || Mount Lemmon || Mount Lemmon Survey ||  || align=right | 3.2 km || 
|-id=375 bgcolor=#d6d6d6
| 541375 ||  || — || April 2, 2011 || Mount Lemmon || Mount Lemmon Survey ||  || align=right | 2.4 km || 
|-id=376 bgcolor=#d6d6d6
| 541376 ||  || — || February 2, 2005 || Kitt Peak || Spacewatch ||  || align=right | 2.4 km || 
|-id=377 bgcolor=#d6d6d6
| 541377 ||  || — || November 27, 2009 || Mount Lemmon || Mount Lemmon Survey ||  || align=right | 2.9 km || 
|-id=378 bgcolor=#d6d6d6
| 541378 ||  || — || March 11, 2005 || Mount Lemmon || Mount Lemmon Survey ||  || align=right | 2.9 km || 
|-id=379 bgcolor=#d6d6d6
| 541379 ||  || — || April 4, 2011 || Mount Lemmon || Mount Lemmon Survey ||  || align=right | 2.9 km || 
|-id=380 bgcolor=#d6d6d6
| 541380 ||  || — || October 24, 2003 || Kitt Peak || Spacewatch || EOS || align=right | 1.4 km || 
|-id=381 bgcolor=#d6d6d6
| 541381 ||  || — || April 1, 2011 || Kitt Peak || Spacewatch ||  || align=right | 2.3 km || 
|-id=382 bgcolor=#fefefe
| 541382 ||  || — || April 1, 2011 || Kitt Peak || Spacewatch ||  || align=right data-sort-value="0.86" | 860 m || 
|-id=383 bgcolor=#fefefe
| 541383 ||  || — || May 7, 2008 || Mount Lemmon || Mount Lemmon Survey ||  || align=right data-sort-value="0.65" | 650 m || 
|-id=384 bgcolor=#d6d6d6
| 541384 ||  || — || February 4, 2005 || Kitt Peak || Spacewatch ||  || align=right | 2.5 km || 
|-id=385 bgcolor=#d6d6d6
| 541385 ||  || — || August 21, 2007 || Anderson Mesa || LONEOS ||  || align=right | 2.7 km || 
|-id=386 bgcolor=#d6d6d6
| 541386 ||  || — || November 24, 2003 || Kitt Peak || Spacewatch ||  || align=right | 3.7 km || 
|-id=387 bgcolor=#d6d6d6
| 541387 ||  || — || August 9, 2013 || Kitt Peak || Spacewatch ||  || align=right | 2.6 km || 
|-id=388 bgcolor=#d6d6d6
| 541388 ||  || — || April 2, 2011 || Westfield || ARO ||  || align=right | 2.2 km || 
|-id=389 bgcolor=#E9E9E9
| 541389 ||  || — || April 26, 2007 || Kitt Peak || Spacewatch ||  || align=right | 2.4 km || 
|-id=390 bgcolor=#d6d6d6
| 541390 ||  || — || April 4, 2011 || Kitt Peak || Spacewatch ||  || align=right | 2.9 km || 
|-id=391 bgcolor=#d6d6d6
| 541391 ||  || — || January 9, 2011 || Mount Lemmon || Mount Lemmon Survey ||  || align=right | 3.0 km || 
|-id=392 bgcolor=#d6d6d6
| 541392 ||  || — || April 2, 2011 || Mount Lemmon || Mount Lemmon Survey ||  || align=right | 2.6 km || 
|-id=393 bgcolor=#d6d6d6
| 541393 ||  || — || April 3, 2011 || Siding Spring || SSS ||  || align=right | 3.4 km || 
|-id=394 bgcolor=#E9E9E9
| 541394 ||  || — || February 11, 2011 || Catalina || CSS ||  || align=right | 3.3 km || 
|-id=395 bgcolor=#d6d6d6
| 541395 ||  || — || October 26, 2008 || Kitt Peak || Spacewatch ||  || align=right | 3.4 km || 
|-id=396 bgcolor=#fefefe
| 541396 ||  || — || March 26, 2011 || Mount Lemmon || Mount Lemmon Survey ||  || align=right data-sort-value="0.52" | 520 m || 
|-id=397 bgcolor=#d6d6d6
| 541397 ||  || — || March 26, 2011 || Kitt Peak || Spacewatch ||  || align=right | 2.8 km || 
|-id=398 bgcolor=#d6d6d6
| 541398 ||  || — || November 7, 2008 || Mount Lemmon || Mount Lemmon Survey ||  || align=right | 3.0 km || 
|-id=399 bgcolor=#d6d6d6
| 541399 ||  || — || April 13, 2011 || Haleakala || Pan-STARRS ||  || align=right | 3.4 km || 
|-id=400 bgcolor=#d6d6d6
| 541400 ||  || — || January 15, 2010 || Kitt Peak || Spacewatch ||  || align=right | 3.1 km || 
|}

541401–541500 

|-bgcolor=#d6d6d6
| 541401 ||  || — || January 6, 2010 || Kitt Peak || Spacewatch ||  || align=right | 3.1 km || 
|-id=402 bgcolor=#d6d6d6
| 541402 ||  || — || August 10, 2007 || Kitt Peak || Spacewatch ||  || align=right | 2.8 km || 
|-id=403 bgcolor=#d6d6d6
| 541403 ||  || — || October 31, 2007 || Catalina || CSS ||  || align=right | 4.2 km || 
|-id=404 bgcolor=#d6d6d6
| 541404 ||  || — || April 13, 2011 || Mount Lemmon || Mount Lemmon Survey ||  || align=right | 3.0 km || 
|-id=405 bgcolor=#d6d6d6
| 541405 ||  || — || April 23, 2011 || Haleakala || Pan-STARRS ||  || align=right | 3.1 km || 
|-id=406 bgcolor=#d6d6d6
| 541406 ||  || — || October 23, 2008 || Kitt Peak || Spacewatch ||  || align=right | 2.6 km || 
|-id=407 bgcolor=#d6d6d6
| 541407 ||  || — || January 19, 2005 || Kitt Peak || Spacewatch ||  || align=right | 2.9 km || 
|-id=408 bgcolor=#d6d6d6
| 541408 ||  || — || March 1, 2005 || Kitt Peak || Spacewatch ||  || align=right | 3.2 km || 
|-id=409 bgcolor=#d6d6d6
| 541409 ||  || — || August 18, 2002 || Palomar || NEAT ||  || align=right | 3.2 km || 
|-id=410 bgcolor=#d6d6d6
| 541410 ||  || — || April 27, 2011 || Kitt Peak || Spacewatch ||  || align=right | 3.5 km || 
|-id=411 bgcolor=#d6d6d6
| 541411 ||  || — || May 30, 2006 || Mount Lemmon || Mount Lemmon Survey ||  || align=right | 2.7 km || 
|-id=412 bgcolor=#d6d6d6
| 541412 ||  || — || May 9, 2006 || Mount Lemmon || Mount Lemmon Survey ||  || align=right | 3.3 km || 
|-id=413 bgcolor=#d6d6d6
| 541413 ||  || — || March 3, 2005 || Kitt Peak || Spacewatch ||  || align=right | 2.4 km || 
|-id=414 bgcolor=#d6d6d6
| 541414 ||  || — || November 20, 2008 || Kitt Peak || Spacewatch ||  || align=right | 3.5 km || 
|-id=415 bgcolor=#d6d6d6
| 541415 ||  || — || April 12, 2011 || Mount Lemmon || Mount Lemmon Survey ||  || align=right | 3.5 km || 
|-id=416 bgcolor=#d6d6d6
| 541416 ||  || — || April 27, 2011 || Haleakala || Pan-STARRS ||  || align=right | 3.1 km || 
|-id=417 bgcolor=#d6d6d6
| 541417 ||  || — || February 16, 2010 || Mount Lemmon || Mount Lemmon Survey ||  || align=right | 2.6 km || 
|-id=418 bgcolor=#d6d6d6
| 541418 ||  || — || April 12, 2011 || Mount Lemmon || Mount Lemmon Survey ||  || align=right | 2.2 km || 
|-id=419 bgcolor=#d6d6d6
| 541419 ||  || — || November 2, 2008 || Mount Lemmon || Mount Lemmon Survey ||  || align=right | 2.6 km || 
|-id=420 bgcolor=#d6d6d6
| 541420 ||  || — || April 28, 2011 || Haleakala || Pan-STARRS ||  || align=right | 3.3 km || 
|-id=421 bgcolor=#d6d6d6
| 541421 ||  || — || April 2, 2011 || Kitt Peak || Spacewatch ||  || align=right | 2.0 km || 
|-id=422 bgcolor=#d6d6d6
| 541422 ||  || — || April 29, 2011 || Kitt Peak || Spacewatch ||  || align=right | 2.7 km || 
|-id=423 bgcolor=#d6d6d6
| 541423 ||  || — || November 24, 2008 || Kitt Peak || Spacewatch ||  || align=right | 3.1 km || 
|-id=424 bgcolor=#d6d6d6
| 541424 ||  || — || November 19, 2008 || Kitt Peak || Spacewatch ||  || align=right | 3.2 km || 
|-id=425 bgcolor=#d6d6d6
| 541425 ||  || — || October 13, 2007 || Mount Lemmon || Mount Lemmon Survey ||  || align=right | 3.3 km || 
|-id=426 bgcolor=#d6d6d6
| 541426 ||  || — || April 30, 2011 || Haleakala || Pan-STARRS ||  || align=right | 2.8 km || 
|-id=427 bgcolor=#d6d6d6
| 541427 ||  || — || April 2, 2011 || Kitt Peak || Spacewatch ||  || align=right | 2.9 km || 
|-id=428 bgcolor=#d6d6d6
| 541428 ||  || — || April 24, 2011 || Kitt Peak || Spacewatch ||  || align=right | 2.5 km || 
|-id=429 bgcolor=#d6d6d6
| 541429 ||  || — || December 8, 2008 || Mount Lemmon || Mount Lemmon Survey ||  || align=right | 3.6 km || 
|-id=430 bgcolor=#d6d6d6
| 541430 ||  || — || May 24, 2006 || Mount Lemmon || Mount Lemmon Survey ||  || align=right | 3.6 km || 
|-id=431 bgcolor=#d6d6d6
| 541431 ||  || — || October 15, 2007 || Catalina || CSS ||  || align=right | 3.7 km || 
|-id=432 bgcolor=#d6d6d6
| 541432 ||  || — || April 14, 2011 || Mount Lemmon || Mount Lemmon Survey ||  || align=right | 2.7 km || 
|-id=433 bgcolor=#fefefe
| 541433 ||  || — || March 26, 2004 || Kitt Peak || Spacewatch ||  || align=right data-sort-value="0.84" | 840 m || 
|-id=434 bgcolor=#d6d6d6
| 541434 ||  || — || November 3, 2008 || Mount Lemmon || Mount Lemmon Survey ||  || align=right | 3.6 km || 
|-id=435 bgcolor=#d6d6d6
| 541435 ||  || — || March 31, 2011 || Mount Lemmon || Mount Lemmon Survey ||  || align=right | 3.9 km || 
|-id=436 bgcolor=#d6d6d6
| 541436 ||  || — || April 30, 2011 || Haleakala || Pan-STARRS ||  || align=right | 3.1 km || 
|-id=437 bgcolor=#fefefe
| 541437 ||  || — || April 4, 2011 || Kitt Peak || Spacewatch ||  || align=right data-sort-value="0.71" | 710 m || 
|-id=438 bgcolor=#d6d6d6
| 541438 ||  || — || April 28, 2011 || Mount Lemmon || Mount Lemmon Survey ||  || align=right | 2.4 km || 
|-id=439 bgcolor=#fefefe
| 541439 ||  || — || July 27, 2005 || Palomar || NEAT ||  || align=right | 1.0 km || 
|-id=440 bgcolor=#d6d6d6
| 541440 ||  || — || September 28, 2008 || Mount Lemmon || Mount Lemmon Survey ||  || align=right | 2.6 km || 
|-id=441 bgcolor=#d6d6d6
| 541441 ||  || — || March 11, 2011 || Mount Lemmon || Mount Lemmon Survey ||  || align=right | 2.2 km || 
|-id=442 bgcolor=#d6d6d6
| 541442 ||  || — || March 16, 2011 || Haleakala || Pan-STARRS ||  || align=right | 3.9 km || 
|-id=443 bgcolor=#d6d6d6
| 541443 ||  || — || May 1, 2011 || Marly || Naef Obs. || EOS || align=right | 1.8 km || 
|-id=444 bgcolor=#d6d6d6
| 541444 ||  || — || May 1, 2011 || Haleakala || Pan-STARRS ||  || align=right | 2.8 km || 
|-id=445 bgcolor=#fefefe
| 541445 ||  || — || May 1, 2011 || Haleakala || Pan-STARRS ||  || align=right data-sort-value="0.67" | 670 m || 
|-id=446 bgcolor=#d6d6d6
| 541446 ||  || — || December 21, 2003 || Kitt Peak || Spacewatch ||  || align=right | 3.1 km || 
|-id=447 bgcolor=#d6d6d6
| 541447 ||  || — || January 15, 2011 || Mount Lemmon || Mount Lemmon Survey ||  || align=right | 4.1 km || 
|-id=448 bgcolor=#d6d6d6
| 541448 ||  || — || May 1, 2011 || Haleakala || Pan-STARRS ||  || align=right | 3.3 km || 
|-id=449 bgcolor=#d6d6d6
| 541449 ||  || — || May 1, 2011 || Haleakala || Pan-STARRS ||  || align=right | 2.9 km || 
|-id=450 bgcolor=#d6d6d6
| 541450 ||  || — || April 23, 2011 || Haleakala || Pan-STARRS ||  || align=right | 2.4 km || 
|-id=451 bgcolor=#fefefe
| 541451 ||  || — || April 7, 2011 || Kitt Peak || Spacewatch ||  || align=right data-sort-value="0.72" | 720 m || 
|-id=452 bgcolor=#d6d6d6
| 541452 ||  || — || November 20, 2008 || Mount Lemmon || Mount Lemmon Survey ||  || align=right | 3.1 km || 
|-id=453 bgcolor=#d6d6d6
| 541453 ||  || — || May 1, 2011 || Mount Lemmon || Mount Lemmon Survey ||  || align=right | 3.8 km || 
|-id=454 bgcolor=#d6d6d6
| 541454 ||  || — || May 1, 2011 || Haleakala || Pan-STARRS ||  || align=right | 2.8 km || 
|-id=455 bgcolor=#d6d6d6
| 541455 ||  || — || September 7, 2008 || Mount Lemmon || Mount Lemmon Survey ||  || align=right | 3.7 km || 
|-id=456 bgcolor=#d6d6d6
| 541456 ||  || — || May 1, 2011 || Haleakala || Pan-STARRS ||  || align=right | 2.6 km || 
|-id=457 bgcolor=#d6d6d6
| 541457 ||  || — || May 3, 2011 || Mount Lemmon || Mount Lemmon Survey ||  || align=right | 2.8 km || 
|-id=458 bgcolor=#d6d6d6
| 541458 ||  || — || November 8, 2008 || Kitt Peak || Spacewatch ||  || align=right | 2.9 km || 
|-id=459 bgcolor=#d6d6d6
| 541459 ||  || — || May 8, 2011 || Mount Lemmon || Mount Lemmon Survey ||  || align=right | 3.4 km || 
|-id=460 bgcolor=#d6d6d6
| 541460 ||  || — || October 2, 2008 || Kitt Peak || Spacewatch ||  || align=right | 2.4 km || 
|-id=461 bgcolor=#fefefe
| 541461 ||  || — || October 29, 2005 || Mount Lemmon || Mount Lemmon Survey ||  || align=right data-sort-value="0.77" | 770 m || 
|-id=462 bgcolor=#fefefe
| 541462 ||  || — || October 7, 2008 || Kitt Peak || Spacewatch ||  || align=right data-sort-value="0.80" | 800 m || 
|-id=463 bgcolor=#d6d6d6
| 541463 ||  || — || May 24, 2011 || Haleakala || Pan-STARRS ||  || align=right | 3.4 km || 
|-id=464 bgcolor=#fefefe
| 541464 ||  || — || May 3, 2011 || Mount Lemmon || Mount Lemmon Survey ||  || align=right data-sort-value="0.66" | 660 m || 
|-id=465 bgcolor=#d6d6d6
| 541465 ||  || — || April 14, 2010 || Mt. Lemmon Survey || WISE ||  || align=right | 2.5 km || 
|-id=466 bgcolor=#fefefe
| 541466 ||  || — || September 22, 2008 || Kitt Peak || Spacewatch ||  || align=right data-sort-value="0.71" | 710 m || 
|-id=467 bgcolor=#fefefe
| 541467 ||  || — || May 28, 2011 || Kitt Peak || Spacewatch ||  || align=right data-sort-value="0.75" | 750 m || 
|-id=468 bgcolor=#d6d6d6
| 541468 ||  || — || May 30, 2011 || Haleakala || Pan-STARRS ||  || align=right | 2.6 km || 
|-id=469 bgcolor=#fefefe
| 541469 ||  || — || June 3, 2011 || Mount Lemmon || Mount Lemmon Survey ||  || align=right data-sort-value="0.71" | 710 m || 
|-id=470 bgcolor=#d6d6d6
| 541470 ||  || — || April 4, 2011 || Kitt Peak || Spacewatch ||  || align=right | 2.3 km || 
|-id=471 bgcolor=#fefefe
| 541471 ||  || — || September 24, 2008 || Mount Lemmon || Mount Lemmon Survey ||  || align=right data-sort-value="0.97" | 970 m || 
|-id=472 bgcolor=#d6d6d6
| 541472 ||  || — || February 15, 2010 || Mount Lemmon || Mount Lemmon Survey ||  || align=right | 2.3 km || 
|-id=473 bgcolor=#fefefe
| 541473 ||  || — || May 6, 2006 || Mount Lemmon || Mount Lemmon Survey || H || align=right data-sort-value="0.45" | 450 m || 
|-id=474 bgcolor=#fefefe
| 541474 ||  || — || July 19, 2001 || Palomar || NEAT ||  || align=right data-sort-value="0.74" | 740 m || 
|-id=475 bgcolor=#d6d6d6
| 541475 ||  || — || October 16, 2007 || Mount Lemmon || Mount Lemmon Survey ||  || align=right | 3.5 km || 
|-id=476 bgcolor=#fefefe
| 541476 ||  || — || June 8, 2011 || Kachina || Kachina Obs. || H || align=right data-sort-value="0.90" | 900 m || 
|-id=477 bgcolor=#FA8072
| 541477 ||  || — || June 6, 2011 || Nogales || M. Schwartz, P. R. Holvorcem || H || align=right data-sort-value="0.82" | 820 m || 
|-id=478 bgcolor=#d6d6d6
| 541478 ||  || — || June 6, 2011 || Haleakala || Pan-STARRS ||  || align=right | 3.5 km || 
|-id=479 bgcolor=#fefefe
| 541479 ||  || — || September 21, 2008 || Kitt Peak || Spacewatch ||  || align=right data-sort-value="0.65" | 650 m || 
|-id=480 bgcolor=#fefefe
| 541480 ||  || — || October 2, 2008 || Kitt Peak || Spacewatch ||  || align=right data-sort-value="0.59" | 590 m || 
|-id=481 bgcolor=#fefefe
| 541481 ||  || — || January 17, 2007 || Kitt Peak || Spacewatch ||  || align=right data-sort-value="0.82" | 820 m || 
|-id=482 bgcolor=#d6d6d6
| 541482 ||  || — || September 29, 1997 || Kitt Peak || Spacewatch ||  || align=right | 3.2 km || 
|-id=483 bgcolor=#d6d6d6
| 541483 ||  || — || December 19, 2003 || Kitt Peak || Spacewatch ||  || align=right | 3.5 km || 
|-id=484 bgcolor=#fefefe
| 541484 ||  || — || December 3, 2008 || Kitt Peak || Spacewatch ||  || align=right data-sort-value="0.67" | 670 m || 
|-id=485 bgcolor=#fefefe
| 541485 ||  || — || July 23, 2011 || Haleakala || Pan-STARRS ||  || align=right data-sort-value="0.75" | 750 m || 
|-id=486 bgcolor=#fefefe
| 541486 ||  || — || November 24, 2008 || Mount Lemmon || Mount Lemmon Survey ||  || align=right data-sort-value="0.78" | 780 m || 
|-id=487 bgcolor=#fefefe
| 541487 Silviapablo ||  ||  || July 25, 2011 || Observatorio Cielo Profundo || Cielo Profundo Obs. ||  || align=right | 1.0 km || 
|-id=488 bgcolor=#fefefe
| 541488 ||  || — || July 28, 2011 || Haleakala || Pan-STARRS ||  || align=right data-sort-value="0.81" | 810 m || 
|-id=489 bgcolor=#fefefe
| 541489 ||  || — || December 6, 2008 || Catalina || CSS ||  || align=right data-sort-value="0.86" | 860 m || 
|-id=490 bgcolor=#fefefe
| 541490 ||  || — || June 22, 2011 || Mount Lemmon || Mount Lemmon Survey ||  || align=right data-sort-value="0.73" | 730 m || 
|-id=491 bgcolor=#fefefe
| 541491 ||  || — || June 22, 2011 || Mount Lemmon || Mount Lemmon Survey ||  || align=right data-sort-value="0.73" | 730 m || 
|-id=492 bgcolor=#fefefe
| 541492 ||  || — || July 23, 2015 || Haleakala || Pan-STARRS ||  || align=right data-sort-value="0.68" | 680 m || 
|-id=493 bgcolor=#fefefe
| 541493 ||  || — || July 22, 2011 || Haleakala || Pan-STARRS ||  || align=right data-sort-value="0.79" | 790 m || 
|-id=494 bgcolor=#fefefe
| 541494 ||  || — || November 3, 2004 || Kitt Peak || Spacewatch || NYS || align=right data-sort-value="0.55" | 550 m || 
|-id=495 bgcolor=#fefefe
| 541495 ||  || — || April 26, 2007 || Mount Lemmon || Mount Lemmon Survey ||  || align=right data-sort-value="0.85" | 850 m || 
|-id=496 bgcolor=#fefefe
| 541496 ||  || — || May 28, 2011 || Mount Lemmon || Mount Lemmon Survey ||  || align=right data-sort-value="0.92" | 920 m || 
|-id=497 bgcolor=#d6d6d6
| 541497 ||  || — || May 31, 2011 || Mount Lemmon || Mount Lemmon Survey || Tj (2.89) || align=right | 4.6 km || 
|-id=498 bgcolor=#fefefe
| 541498 ||  || — || June 21, 2011 || Kitt Peak || Spacewatch ||  || align=right data-sort-value="0.96" | 960 m || 
|-id=499 bgcolor=#fefefe
| 541499 ||  || — || November 8, 2008 || Kitt Peak || Spacewatch ||  || align=right data-sort-value="0.77" | 770 m || 
|-id=500 bgcolor=#fefefe
| 541500 ||  || — || July 28, 2007 || Mauna Kea || Mauna Kea Obs. ||  || align=right data-sort-value="0.71" | 710 m || 
|}

541501–541600 

|-bgcolor=#fefefe
| 541501 ||  || — || August 4, 2011 || Haleakala || Pan-STARRS ||  || align=right data-sort-value="0.81" | 810 m || 
|-id=502 bgcolor=#fefefe
| 541502 ||  || — || July 2, 2011 || Kitt Peak || Spacewatch ||  || align=right data-sort-value="0.90" | 900 m || 
|-id=503 bgcolor=#fefefe
| 541503 ||  || — || July 28, 2011 || Haleakala || Pan-STARRS ||  || align=right data-sort-value="0.90" | 900 m || 
|-id=504 bgcolor=#fefefe
| 541504 ||  || — || January 7, 2002 || Kitt Peak || Spacewatch ||  || align=right | 1.2 km || 
|-id=505 bgcolor=#fefefe
| 541505 ||  || — || January 23, 2006 || Mount Lemmon || Mount Lemmon Survey ||  || align=right data-sort-value="0.96" | 960 m || 
|-id=506 bgcolor=#fefefe
| 541506 ||  || — || August 23, 2011 || Haleakala || Pan-STARRS ||  || align=right data-sort-value="0.78" | 780 m || 
|-id=507 bgcolor=#d6d6d6
| 541507 ||  || — || September 4, 2003 || Kitt Peak || Spacewatch || Tj (2.94) || align=right | 3.4 km || 
|-id=508 bgcolor=#fefefe
| 541508 Liucixin ||  ||  || August 27, 2011 || Zelenchukskaya St. || T. V. Kryachko, B. Satovski ||  || align=right data-sort-value="0.93" | 930 m || 
|-id=509 bgcolor=#E9E9E9
| 541509 ||  || — || August 24, 2011 || Haleakala || Pan-STARRS ||  || align=right data-sort-value="0.85" | 850 m || 
|-id=510 bgcolor=#fefefe
| 541510 ||  || — || August 31, 2011 || Sierra Stars || Sierra Stars Obs. || NYS || align=right data-sort-value="0.63" | 630 m || 
|-id=511 bgcolor=#fefefe
| 541511 ||  || — || December 22, 2008 || Kitt Peak || Spacewatch ||  || align=right data-sort-value="0.75" | 750 m || 
|-id=512 bgcolor=#fefefe
| 541512 ||  || — || May 23, 2003 || Kitt Peak || Spacewatch ||  || align=right data-sort-value="0.91" | 910 m || 
|-id=513 bgcolor=#fefefe
| 541513 ||  || — || August 23, 2011 || Haleakala || Pan-STARRS ||  || align=right data-sort-value="0.79" | 790 m || 
|-id=514 bgcolor=#fefefe
| 541514 ||  || — || August 25, 2011 || La Sagra || OAM Obs. ||  || align=right data-sort-value="0.68" | 680 m || 
|-id=515 bgcolor=#fefefe
| 541515 ||  || — || August 22, 2011 || La Sagra || OAM Obs. ||  || align=right data-sort-value="0.75" | 750 m || 
|-id=516 bgcolor=#fefefe
| 541516 ||  || — || October 26, 2008 || Kitt Peak || Spacewatch ||  || align=right data-sort-value="0.79" | 790 m || 
|-id=517 bgcolor=#fefefe
| 541517 ||  || — || August 23, 2011 || Haleakala || Pan-STARRS ||  || align=right data-sort-value="0.73" | 730 m || 
|-id=518 bgcolor=#fefefe
| 541518 ||  || — || August 24, 2011 || Haleakala || Pan-STARRS ||  || align=right data-sort-value="0.82" | 820 m || 
|-id=519 bgcolor=#fefefe
| 541519 ||  || — || August 27, 2011 || Haleakala || Pan-STARRS ||  || align=right data-sort-value="0.75" | 750 m || 
|-id=520 bgcolor=#fefefe
| 541520 ||  || — || February 4, 2006 || Kitt Peak || Spacewatch ||  || align=right data-sort-value="0.78" | 780 m || 
|-id=521 bgcolor=#fefefe
| 541521 ||  || — || August 30, 2011 || Haleakala || Pan-STARRS ||  || align=right data-sort-value="0.86" | 860 m || 
|-id=522 bgcolor=#d6d6d6
| 541522 ||  || — || August 28, 2011 || Siding Spring || SSS ||  || align=right | 2.7 km || 
|-id=523 bgcolor=#d6d6d6
| 541523 ||  || — || September 8, 2011 || Palomar || PTF || Tj (2.95) || align=right | 3.5 km || 
|-id=524 bgcolor=#fefefe
| 541524 ||  || — || October 5, 2011 || Haleakala || Pan-STARRS ||  || align=right | 1.1 km || 
|-id=525 bgcolor=#fefefe
| 541525 ||  || — || September 2, 2011 || Haleakala || Pan-STARRS ||  || align=right data-sort-value="0.71" | 710 m || 
|-id=526 bgcolor=#E9E9E9
| 541526 ||  || — || September 4, 2011 || Haleakala || Pan-STARRS ||  || align=right data-sort-value="0.75" | 750 m || 
|-id=527 bgcolor=#d6d6d6
| 541527 ||  || — || April 27, 2006 || Cerro Tololo || Cerro Tololo Obs. || SHU3:2 || align=right | 4.1 km || 
|-id=528 bgcolor=#fefefe
| 541528 ||  || — || January 9, 2006 || Kitt Peak || Spacewatch || V || align=right data-sort-value="0.55" | 550 m || 
|-id=529 bgcolor=#fefefe
| 541529 ||  || — || October 24, 2005 || Mauna Kea || Mauna Kea Obs. || V || align=right data-sort-value="0.63" | 630 m || 
|-id=530 bgcolor=#fefefe
| 541530 ||  || — || September 5, 2011 || Haleakala || Pan-STARRS || H || align=right data-sort-value="0.78" | 780 m || 
|-id=531 bgcolor=#fefefe
| 541531 ||  || — || September 4, 2011 || Kitt Peak || Spacewatch ||  || align=right data-sort-value="0.75" | 750 m || 
|-id=532 bgcolor=#fefefe
| 541532 ||  || — || September 2, 2011 || Haleakala || Pan-STARRS ||  || align=right data-sort-value="0.78" | 780 m || 
|-id=533 bgcolor=#fefefe
| 541533 ||  || — || September 4, 2011 || Haleakala || Pan-STARRS ||  || align=right data-sort-value="0.75" | 750 m || 
|-id=534 bgcolor=#fefefe
| 541534 ||  || — || September 18, 2011 || Mount Lemmon || Mount Lemmon Survey ||  || align=right data-sort-value="0.65" | 650 m || 
|-id=535 bgcolor=#fefefe
| 541535 ||  || — || September 20, 2003 || Kitt Peak || Spacewatch || H || align=right data-sort-value="0.49" | 490 m || 
|-id=536 bgcolor=#E9E9E9
| 541536 ||  || — || October 21, 2003 || Palomar || NEAT ||  || align=right data-sort-value="0.80" | 800 m || 
|-id=537 bgcolor=#E9E9E9
| 541537 ||  || — || September 20, 2011 || Haleakala || Pan-STARRS ||  || align=right data-sort-value="0.86" | 860 m || 
|-id=538 bgcolor=#fefefe
| 541538 ||  || — || December 22, 2008 || Kitt Peak || Spacewatch ||  || align=right data-sort-value="0.90" | 900 m || 
|-id=539 bgcolor=#E9E9E9
| 541539 ||  || — || October 14, 2007 || Kitt Peak || Spacewatch ||  || align=right data-sort-value="0.77" | 770 m || 
|-id=540 bgcolor=#fefefe
| 541540 ||  || — || September 20, 2011 || Kitt Peak || Spacewatch ||  || align=right data-sort-value="0.86" | 860 m || 
|-id=541 bgcolor=#d6d6d6
| 541541 ||  || — || September 20, 2011 || Kitt Peak || Spacewatch || 3:2 || align=right | 3.5 km || 
|-id=542 bgcolor=#fefefe
| 541542 ||  || — || September 17, 2011 || Haleakala || Pan-STARRS ||  || align=right data-sort-value="0.90" | 900 m || 
|-id=543 bgcolor=#fefefe
| 541543 ||  || — || September 2, 2011 || Haleakala || Pan-STARRS ||  || align=right data-sort-value="0.86" | 860 m || 
|-id=544 bgcolor=#fefefe
| 541544 ||  || — || September 2, 2011 || Haleakala || Pan-STARRS ||  || align=right data-sort-value="0.75" | 750 m || 
|-id=545 bgcolor=#fefefe
| 541545 ||  || — || September 11, 2007 || Mount Lemmon || Mount Lemmon Survey ||  || align=right data-sort-value="0.62" | 620 m || 
|-id=546 bgcolor=#fefefe
| 541546 ||  || — || December 19, 2004 || Mount Lemmon || Mount Lemmon Survey ||  || align=right data-sort-value="0.71" | 710 m || 
|-id=547 bgcolor=#d6d6d6
| 541547 ||  || — || October 20, 2003 || Kitt Peak || Spacewatch || Tj (2.95) || align=right | 2.9 km || 
|-id=548 bgcolor=#FA8072
| 541548 ||  || — || March 14, 2010 || Kitt Peak || Spacewatch || H || align=right data-sort-value="0.83" | 830 m || 
|-id=549 bgcolor=#E9E9E9
| 541549 ||  || — || September 10, 2007 || Mount Lemmon || Mount Lemmon Survey ||  || align=right data-sort-value="0.86" | 860 m || 
|-id=550 bgcolor=#fefefe
| 541550 Schickbéla ||  ||  || August 30, 2011 || Piszkesteto || K. Sárneczky || H || align=right data-sort-value="0.60" | 600 m || 
|-id=551 bgcolor=#fefefe
| 541551 ||  || — || September 24, 2011 || Volkssternwarte Drebach || G. Lehmann, A. Knöfel ||  || align=right data-sort-value="0.94" | 940 m || 
|-id=552 bgcolor=#fefefe
| 541552 ||  || — || September 19, 2011 || La Sagra || OAM Obs. || H || align=right data-sort-value="0.62" | 620 m || 
|-id=553 bgcolor=#fefefe
| 541553 ||  || — || September 3, 2007 || Steward || R. Ferrando, M. Ferrando ||  || align=right | 1.1 km || 
|-id=554 bgcolor=#fefefe
| 541554 ||  || — || September 12, 2007 || Mount Lemmon || Mount Lemmon Survey ||  || align=right data-sort-value="0.75" | 750 m || 
|-id=555 bgcolor=#FA8072
| 541555 ||  || — || September 25, 2011 || Crni Vrh || Črni Vrh ||  || align=right data-sort-value="0.90" | 900 m || 
|-id=556 bgcolor=#fefefe
| 541556 ||  || — || September 21, 2011 || Catalina || CSS ||  || align=right data-sort-value="0.79" | 790 m || 
|-id=557 bgcolor=#E9E9E9
| 541557 ||  || — || September 23, 2011 || Kitt Peak || Spacewatch ||  || align=right data-sort-value="0.75" | 750 m || 
|-id=558 bgcolor=#E9E9E9
| 541558 ||  || — || September 21, 2011 || Kitt Peak || Spacewatch ||  || align=right data-sort-value="0.52" | 520 m || 
|-id=559 bgcolor=#d6d6d6
| 541559 ||  || — || March 28, 2008 || Mount Lemmon || Mount Lemmon Survey || 7:4 || align=right | 3.8 km || 
|-id=560 bgcolor=#fefefe
| 541560 ||  || — || September 23, 2011 || Kitt Peak || Spacewatch ||  || align=right data-sort-value="0.94" | 940 m || 
|-id=561 bgcolor=#fefefe
| 541561 ||  || — || September 23, 2011 || Haleakala || Pan-STARRS || H || align=right data-sort-value="0.54" | 540 m || 
|-id=562 bgcolor=#E9E9E9
| 541562 ||  || — || September 23, 2011 || Kitt Peak || Spacewatch ||  || align=right data-sort-value="0.98" | 980 m || 
|-id=563 bgcolor=#fefefe
| 541563 ||  || — || September 23, 2011 || Kitt Peak || Spacewatch || H || align=right data-sort-value="0.52" | 520 m || 
|-id=564 bgcolor=#fefefe
| 541564 ||  || — || September 26, 2011 || Kitt Peak || Spacewatch || H || align=right data-sort-value="0.57" | 570 m || 
|-id=565 bgcolor=#fefefe
| 541565 Gucklerkároly ||  ||  || August 26, 2011 || Piszkesteto || K. Sárneczky || V || align=right data-sort-value="0.65" | 650 m || 
|-id=566 bgcolor=#fefefe
| 541566 ||  || — || August 15, 2007 || Tiki || Tiki Obs. ||  || align=right data-sort-value="0.65" | 650 m || 
|-id=567 bgcolor=#fefefe
| 541567 ||  || — || September 21, 2011 || Catalina || CSS || H || align=right data-sort-value="0.68" | 680 m || 
|-id=568 bgcolor=#E9E9E9
| 541568 ||  || — || September 24, 2011 || Haleakala || Pan-STARRS ||  || align=right data-sort-value="0.92" | 920 m || 
|-id=569 bgcolor=#E9E9E9
| 541569 ||  || — || September 23, 2003 || Palomar || NEAT ||  || align=right data-sort-value="0.71" | 710 m || 
|-id=570 bgcolor=#fefefe
| 541570 ||  || — || September 29, 2011 || Mount Lemmon || Mount Lemmon Survey ||  || align=right data-sort-value="0.89" | 890 m || 
|-id=571 bgcolor=#E9E9E9
| 541571 Schulekfrigyes ||  ||  || September 30, 2011 || Piszkesteto || K. Sárneczky ||  || align=right | 1.3 km || 
|-id=572 bgcolor=#fefefe
| 541572 ||  || — || December 1, 2008 || Mount Lemmon || Mount Lemmon Survey ||  || align=right data-sort-value="0.86" | 860 m || 
|-id=573 bgcolor=#fefefe
| 541573 ||  || — || December 31, 2008 || Kitt Peak || Spacewatch ||  || align=right data-sort-value="0.68" | 680 m || 
|-id=574 bgcolor=#fefefe
| 541574 ||  || — || January 19, 2009 || Mount Lemmon || Mount Lemmon Survey ||  || align=right data-sort-value="0.68" | 680 m || 
|-id=575 bgcolor=#E9E9E9
| 541575 ||  || — || September 28, 2011 || Zelenchukskaya St. || T. V. Kryachko, B. Satovski ||  || align=right | 4.0 km || 
|-id=576 bgcolor=#fefefe
| 541576 ||  || — || July 21, 2007 || Lulin || LUSS ||  || align=right data-sort-value="0.96" | 960 m || 
|-id=577 bgcolor=#d6d6d6
| 541577 ||  || — || October 22, 1995 || Kitt Peak || Spacewatch || SHU3:2 || align=right | 5.2 km || 
|-id=578 bgcolor=#E9E9E9
| 541578 ||  || — || August 10, 2007 || Kitt Peak || Spacewatch ||  || align=right | 1.1 km || 
|-id=579 bgcolor=#fefefe
| 541579 ||  || — || October 26, 2011 || Haleakala || Pan-STARRS ||  || align=right data-sort-value="0.75" | 750 m || 
|-id=580 bgcolor=#fefefe
| 541580 ||  || — || May 11, 2003 || Kitt Peak || Spacewatch || H || align=right data-sort-value="0.47" | 470 m || 
|-id=581 bgcolor=#E9E9E9
| 541581 ||  || — || September 29, 2011 || Kitt Peak || Spacewatch ||  || align=right data-sort-value="0.78" | 780 m || 
|-id=582 bgcolor=#E9E9E9
| 541582 Tóthimre ||  ||  || October 4, 2011 || Piszkesteto || K. Sárneczky ||  || align=right | 1.9 km || 
|-id=583 bgcolor=#fefefe
| 541583 ||  || — || October 5, 2011 || Haleakala || Pan-STARRS || H || align=right data-sort-value="0.59" | 590 m || 
|-id=584 bgcolor=#fefefe
| 541584 ||  || — || October 14, 2007 || Mount Lemmon || Mount Lemmon Survey ||  || align=right data-sort-value="0.98" | 980 m || 
|-id=585 bgcolor=#d6d6d6
| 541585 ||  || — || September 26, 2011 || Haleakala || Pan-STARRS || SHU3:2 || align=right | 4.9 km || 
|-id=586 bgcolor=#fefefe
| 541586 ||  || — || May 25, 2006 || Mauna Kea || Mauna Kea Obs. ||  || align=right | 1.1 km || 
|-id=587 bgcolor=#E9E9E9
| 541587 Paparó ||  ||  || October 1, 2011 || Piszkesteto || K. Sárneczky ||  || align=right | 1.9 km || 
|-id=588 bgcolor=#fefefe
| 541588 ||  || — || September 21, 2011 || Kitt Peak || Spacewatch ||  || align=right data-sort-value="0.87" | 870 m || 
|-id=589 bgcolor=#FA8072
| 541589 ||  || — || October 3, 2011 || XuYi || PMO NEO || H || align=right data-sort-value="0.68" | 680 m || 
|-id=590 bgcolor=#fefefe
| 541590 ||  || — || September 28, 2003 || Kitt Peak || Spacewatch || H || align=right data-sort-value="0.32" | 320 m || 
|-id=591 bgcolor=#fefefe
| 541591 ||  || — || September 16, 2003 || Kitt Peak || Spacewatch ||  || align=right data-sort-value="0.65" | 650 m || 
|-id=592 bgcolor=#fefefe
| 541592 ||  || — || March 13, 2005 || Mt. Lemmon Survey || K. Černis, J. Zdanavičius || H || align=right data-sort-value="0.75" | 750 m || 
|-id=593 bgcolor=#E9E9E9
| 541593 ||  || — || November 2, 2007 || Kitt Peak || Spacewatch ||  || align=right data-sort-value="0.68" | 680 m || 
|-id=594 bgcolor=#E9E9E9
| 541594 ||  || — || December 6, 2007 || Mount Lemmon || Mount Lemmon Survey ||  || align=right data-sort-value="0.57" | 570 m || 
|-id=595 bgcolor=#fefefe
| 541595 ||  || — || September 24, 2011 || Catalina || CSS ||  || align=right data-sort-value="0.98" | 980 m || 
|-id=596 bgcolor=#E9E9E9
| 541596 ||  || — || October 20, 2011 || Kitt Peak || Spacewatch ||  || align=right data-sort-value="0.78" | 780 m || 
|-id=597 bgcolor=#E9E9E9
| 541597 ||  || — || October 20, 2011 || Mount Lemmon || Mount Lemmon Survey ||  || align=right | 1.1 km || 
|-id=598 bgcolor=#d6d6d6
| 541598 ||  || — || September 18, 2003 || Kitt Peak || Spacewatch || 3:2 || align=right | 3.2 km || 
|-id=599 bgcolor=#fefefe
| 541599 ||  || — || August 23, 2011 || Haleakala || Pan-STARRS || H || align=right data-sort-value="0.57" | 570 m || 
|-id=600 bgcolor=#d6d6d6
| 541600 ||  || — || September 17, 2003 || Palomar || NEAT || Tj (2.94) || align=right | 3.7 km || 
|}

541601–541700 

|-bgcolor=#d6d6d6
| 541601 ||  || — || October 24, 2003 || Kitt Peak || Spacewatch || SHU3:2 || align=right | 4.6 km || 
|-id=602 bgcolor=#fefefe
| 541602 ||  || — || October 18, 2011 || Kitt Peak || Spacewatch || H || align=right data-sort-value="0.62" | 620 m || 
|-id=603 bgcolor=#E9E9E9
| 541603 ||  || — || October 20, 2011 || Haleakala || Pan-STARRS ||  || align=right | 1.2 km || 
|-id=604 bgcolor=#d6d6d6
| 541604 ||  || — || September 18, 1995 || Kitt Peak || Spacewatch || 3:2 || align=right | 3.8 km || 
|-id=605 bgcolor=#fefefe
| 541605 ||  || — || October 20, 2011 || Mount Lemmon || Mount Lemmon Survey ||  || align=right data-sort-value="0.94" | 940 m || 
|-id=606 bgcolor=#E9E9E9
| 541606 ||  || — || June 11, 2010 || Mount Lemmon || Mount Lemmon Survey ||  || align=right data-sort-value="0.90" | 900 m || 
|-id=607 bgcolor=#E9E9E9
| 541607 ||  || — || November 8, 2007 || Kitt Peak || Spacewatch ||  || align=right data-sort-value="0.78" | 780 m || 
|-id=608 bgcolor=#E9E9E9
| 541608 ||  || — || October 21, 2011 || Mount Lemmon || Mount Lemmon Survey ||  || align=right data-sort-value="0.81" | 810 m || 
|-id=609 bgcolor=#fefefe
| 541609 ||  || — || May 31, 2005 || Reedy Creek || Reedy Creek Obs. || H || align=right data-sort-value="0.89" | 890 m || 
|-id=610 bgcolor=#E9E9E9
| 541610 ||  || — || October 7, 2011 || La Sagra || OAM Obs. ||  || align=right data-sort-value="0.74" | 740 m || 
|-id=611 bgcolor=#fefefe
| 541611 ||  || — || October 20, 2011 || Mount Lemmon || Mount Lemmon Survey ||  || align=right data-sort-value="0.75" | 750 m || 
|-id=612 bgcolor=#E9E9E9
| 541612 ||  || — || November 2, 2007 || Kitt Peak || Spacewatch ||  || align=right data-sort-value="0.68" | 680 m || 
|-id=613 bgcolor=#fefefe
| 541613 ||  || — || October 21, 2011 || Mount Lemmon || Mount Lemmon Survey || H || align=right data-sort-value="0.58" | 580 m || 
|-id=614 bgcolor=#fefefe
| 541614 ||  || — || September 21, 2003 || Kitt Peak || Spacewatch ||  || align=right data-sort-value="0.84" | 840 m || 
|-id=615 bgcolor=#E9E9E9
| 541615 ||  || — || October 7, 2007 || Kitt Peak || Spacewatch || EUN || align=right data-sort-value="0.96" | 960 m || 
|-id=616 bgcolor=#E9E9E9
| 541616 ||  || — || November 12, 2007 || Mount Lemmon || Mount Lemmon Survey ||  || align=right data-sort-value="0.90" | 900 m || 
|-id=617 bgcolor=#E9E9E9
| 541617 ||  || — || September 26, 2011 || Catalina || CSS || MAR || align=right | 1.1 km || 
|-id=618 bgcolor=#fefefe
| 541618 Magyaribéla ||  ||  || October 3, 2011 || Piszkesteto || K. Sárneczky || H || align=right data-sort-value="0.64" | 640 m || 
|-id=619 bgcolor=#E9E9E9
| 541619 ||  || — || October 23, 2011 || Westfield || ARO ||  || align=right | 1.8 km || 
|-id=620 bgcolor=#E9E9E9
| 541620 ||  || — || October 23, 2011 || Haleakala || Pan-STARRS ||  || align=right data-sort-value="0.89" | 890 m || 
|-id=621 bgcolor=#E9E9E9
| 541621 ||  || — || November 2, 2007 || Mount Lemmon || Mount Lemmon Survey ||  || align=right data-sort-value="0.82" | 820 m || 
|-id=622 bgcolor=#E9E9E9
| 541622 ||  || — || October 23, 2011 || Kitt Peak || Spacewatch ||  || align=right | 1.3 km || 
|-id=623 bgcolor=#E9E9E9
| 541623 ||  || — || October 23, 2011 || Kitt Peak || Spacewatch ||  || align=right data-sort-value="0.71" | 710 m || 
|-id=624 bgcolor=#d6d6d6
| 541624 ||  || — || October 24, 2011 || Kitt Peak || Spacewatch || 3:2 || align=right | 3.9 km || 
|-id=625 bgcolor=#d6d6d6
| 541625 ||  || — || September 18, 2003 || Kitt Peak || Spacewatch || Tj (2.95) || align=right | 3.0 km || 
|-id=626 bgcolor=#fefefe
| 541626 ||  || — || October 23, 2011 || Kitt Peak || Spacewatch ||  || align=right data-sort-value="0.80" | 800 m || 
|-id=627 bgcolor=#E9E9E9
| 541627 Halmospál ||  ||  || October 2, 2011 || Piszkesteto || K. Sárneczky || MAR || align=right | 1.3 km || 
|-id=628 bgcolor=#fefefe
| 541628 ||  || — || October 24, 2011 || Mount Lemmon || Mount Lemmon Survey ||  || align=right data-sort-value="0.93" | 930 m || 
|-id=629 bgcolor=#E9E9E9
| 541629 ||  || — || May 4, 2005 || Mauna Kea || Mauna Kea Obs. ||  || align=right | 2.5 km || 
|-id=630 bgcolor=#fefefe
| 541630 ||  || — || October 26, 2011 || Haleakala || Pan-STARRS || H || align=right data-sort-value="0.78" | 780 m || 
|-id=631 bgcolor=#E9E9E9
| 541631 ||  || — || September 21, 2011 || Zelenchukskaya St. || T. V. Kryachko, B. Satovski ||  || align=right | 2.3 km || 
|-id=632 bgcolor=#E9E9E9
| 541632 ||  || — || October 23, 2011 || Haleakala || Pan-STARRS ||  || align=right data-sort-value="0.83" | 830 m || 
|-id=633 bgcolor=#E9E9E9
| 541633 ||  || — || December 14, 2003 || Kitt Peak || Spacewatch ||  || align=right data-sort-value="0.71" | 710 m || 
|-id=634 bgcolor=#fefefe
| 541634 ||  || — || October 29, 2003 || Kitt Peak || Spacewatch || H || align=right data-sort-value="0.57" | 570 m || 
|-id=635 bgcolor=#fefefe
| 541635 ||  || — || November 21, 2003 || Kitt Peak || Spacewatch || H || align=right data-sort-value="0.68" | 680 m || 
|-id=636 bgcolor=#d6d6d6
| 541636 ||  || — || September 26, 2011 || Kitt Peak || Spacewatch ||  || align=right | 2.3 km || 
|-id=637 bgcolor=#E9E9E9
| 541637 ||  || — || October 18, 2007 || Kitt Peak || Spacewatch ||  || align=right data-sort-value="0.68" | 680 m || 
|-id=638 bgcolor=#fefefe
| 541638 ||  || — || October 22, 2011 || Kitt Peak || Spacewatch || H || align=right data-sort-value="0.66" | 660 m || 
|-id=639 bgcolor=#E9E9E9
| 541639 ||  || — || October 24, 2011 || Haleakala || Pan-STARRS || MAR || align=right data-sort-value="0.89" | 890 m || 
|-id=640 bgcolor=#d6d6d6
| 541640 ||  || — || October 24, 2011 || Haleakala || Pan-STARRS ||  || align=right | 2.3 km || 
|-id=641 bgcolor=#fefefe
| 541641 ||  || — || October 22, 2011 || Westfield || ARO || H || align=right data-sort-value="0.62" | 620 m || 
|-id=642 bgcolor=#E9E9E9
| 541642 ||  || — || October 26, 2011 || Haleakala || Pan-STARRS || (5) || align=right data-sort-value="0.66" | 660 m || 
|-id=643 bgcolor=#E9E9E9
| 541643 ||  || — || October 26, 2011 || Haleakala || Pan-STARRS ||  || align=right data-sort-value="0.68" | 680 m || 
|-id=644 bgcolor=#E9E9E9
| 541644 ||  || — || October 21, 2011 || Mount Lemmon || Mount Lemmon Survey ||  || align=right data-sort-value="0.75" | 750 m || 
|-id=645 bgcolor=#E9E9E9
| 541645 ||  || — || November 14, 2007 || Kitt Peak || Spacewatch ||  || align=right data-sort-value="0.89" | 890 m || 
|-id=646 bgcolor=#fefefe
| 541646 ||  || — || October 24, 2011 || Haleakala || Pan-STARRS ||  || align=right data-sort-value="0.84" | 840 m || 
|-id=647 bgcolor=#fefefe
| 541647 ||  || — || October 24, 2011 || Haleakala || Pan-STARRS || H || align=right data-sort-value="0.63" | 630 m || 
|-id=648 bgcolor=#E9E9E9
| 541648 ||  || — || March 11, 2005 || Kitt Peak || Spacewatch ||  || align=right data-sort-value="0.80" | 800 m || 
|-id=649 bgcolor=#E9E9E9
| 541649 ||  || — || November 5, 2007 || Kitt Peak || Spacewatch ||  || align=right data-sort-value="0.91" | 910 m || 
|-id=650 bgcolor=#fefefe
| 541650 ||  || — || September 24, 2011 || Mount Lemmon || Mount Lemmon Survey || H || align=right data-sort-value="0.71" | 710 m || 
|-id=651 bgcolor=#E9E9E9
| 541651 ||  || — || September 24, 2011 || Mount Lemmon || Mount Lemmon Survey ||  || align=right data-sort-value="0.82" | 820 m || 
|-id=652 bgcolor=#E9E9E9
| 541652 ||  || — || October 26, 2011 || Haleakala || Pan-STARRS ||  || align=right data-sort-value="0.91" | 910 m || 
|-id=653 bgcolor=#E9E9E9
| 541653 ||  || — || September 30, 2011 || Mount Lemmon || Mount Lemmon Survey ||  || align=right data-sort-value="0.75" | 750 m || 
|-id=654 bgcolor=#E9E9E9
| 541654 ||  || — || October 24, 2011 || Haleakala || Pan-STARRS ||  || align=right | 1.6 km || 
|-id=655 bgcolor=#fefefe
| 541655 ||  || — || April 20, 2010 || Mount Lemmon || Mount Lemmon Survey || H || align=right data-sort-value="0.54" | 540 m || 
|-id=656 bgcolor=#fefefe
| 541656 ||  || — || August 14, 2007 || Bergisch Gladbach || Bergisch Gladbach Obs. ||  || align=right data-sort-value="0.91" | 910 m || 
|-id=657 bgcolor=#fefefe
| 541657 ||  || — || February 27, 2009 || Kitt Peak || Spacewatch ||  || align=right data-sort-value="0.62" | 620 m || 
|-id=658 bgcolor=#d6d6d6
| 541658 ||  || — || August 31, 2011 || Haleakala || Pan-STARRS || 7:4 || align=right | 4.3 km || 
|-id=659 bgcolor=#fefefe
| 541659 ||  || — || October 30, 2011 || Mount Lemmon || Mount Lemmon Survey ||  || align=right data-sort-value="0.76" | 760 m || 
|-id=660 bgcolor=#E9E9E9
| 541660 ||  || — || May 14, 2001 || Palomar || NEAT ||  || align=right | 1.9 km || 
|-id=661 bgcolor=#d6d6d6
| 541661 ||  || — || September 24, 2000 || Kitt Peak || Spacewatch ||  || align=right | 2.0 km || 
|-id=662 bgcolor=#E9E9E9
| 541662 ||  || — || December 4, 2007 || Catalina || CSS ||  || align=right data-sort-value="0.87" | 870 m || 
|-id=663 bgcolor=#E9E9E9
| 541663 ||  || — || October 25, 2011 || Haleakala || Pan-STARRS ||  || align=right | 1.1 km || 
|-id=664 bgcolor=#E9E9E9
| 541664 ||  || — || October 24, 2007 || Mount Lemmon || Mount Lemmon Survey ||  || align=right | 1.1 km || 
|-id=665 bgcolor=#E9E9E9
| 541665 ||  || — || October 28, 2011 || Kitt Peak || Spacewatch ||  || align=right data-sort-value="0.94" | 940 m || 
|-id=666 bgcolor=#E9E9E9
| 541666 ||  || — || October 21, 2011 || Mount Lemmon || Mount Lemmon Survey ||  || align=right data-sort-value="0.76" | 760 m || 
|-id=667 bgcolor=#fefefe
| 541667 ||  || — || October 17, 2011 || Kitt Peak || Spacewatch ||  || align=right data-sort-value="0.84" | 840 m || 
|-id=668 bgcolor=#E9E9E9
| 541668 ||  || — || September 15, 2007 || Mount Lemmon || Mount Lemmon Survey ||  || align=right data-sort-value="0.92" | 920 m || 
|-id=669 bgcolor=#fefefe
| 541669 ||  || — || September 25, 2011 || Haleakala || Pan-STARRS ||  || align=right data-sort-value="0.81" | 810 m || 
|-id=670 bgcolor=#E9E9E9
| 541670 ||  || — || June 5, 2010 || Nogales || M. Schwartz, P. R. Holvorcem ||  || align=right | 1.2 km || 
|-id=671 bgcolor=#d6d6d6
| 541671 ||  || — || September 20, 2003 || Mt. Lemmon Survey || A. Boattini, A. Di Paola || 3:2 || align=right | 4.4 km || 
|-id=672 bgcolor=#E9E9E9
| 541672 ||  || — || September 24, 2011 || Catalina || CSS ||  || align=right data-sort-value="0.92" | 920 m || 
|-id=673 bgcolor=#fefefe
| 541673 ||  || — || October 20, 2007 || Mount Lemmon || Mount Lemmon Survey ||  || align=right data-sort-value="0.59" | 590 m || 
|-id=674 bgcolor=#E9E9E9
| 541674 ||  || — || November 18, 2007 || Mount Lemmon || Mount Lemmon Survey ||  || align=right data-sort-value="0.71" | 710 m || 
|-id=675 bgcolor=#E9E9E9
| 541675 ||  || — || October 22, 2011 || Kitt Peak || Spacewatch ||  || align=right data-sort-value="0.78" | 780 m || 
|-id=676 bgcolor=#fefefe
| 541676 ||  || — || January 23, 2006 || Kitt Peak || Spacewatch ||  || align=right data-sort-value="0.76" | 760 m || 
|-id=677 bgcolor=#fefefe
| 541677 ||  || — || February 20, 2006 || Catalina || CSS ||  || align=right | 1.1 km || 
|-id=678 bgcolor=#E9E9E9
| 541678 ||  || — || October 24, 2011 || Haleakala || Pan-STARRS ||  || align=right data-sort-value="0.82" | 820 m || 
|-id=679 bgcolor=#fefefe
| 541679 ||  || — || October 24, 2011 || Haleakala || Pan-STARRS ||  || align=right data-sort-value="0.77" | 770 m || 
|-id=680 bgcolor=#E9E9E9
| 541680 ||  || — || October 24, 2011 || Haleakala || Pan-STARRS ||  || align=right | 1.1 km || 
|-id=681 bgcolor=#E9E9E9
| 541681 ||  || — || September 24, 2011 || Haleakala || Pan-STARRS ||  || align=right data-sort-value="0.86" | 860 m || 
|-id=682 bgcolor=#E9E9E9
| 541682 ||  || — || September 24, 2011 || Haleakala || Pan-STARRS ||  || align=right | 1.1 km || 
|-id=683 bgcolor=#E9E9E9
| 541683 ||  || — || March 31, 2004 || Kitt Peak || Spacewatch ||  || align=right | 1.5 km || 
|-id=684 bgcolor=#E9E9E9
| 541684 ||  || — || August 4, 2002 || Palomar || NEAT ||  || align=right | 1.3 km || 
|-id=685 bgcolor=#E9E9E9
| 541685 ||  || — || October 23, 2011 || Mount Lemmon || Mount Lemmon Survey ||  || align=right data-sort-value="0.97" | 970 m || 
|-id=686 bgcolor=#fefefe
| 541686 ||  || — || January 14, 1994 || Kitt Peak || Spacewatch ||  || align=right data-sort-value="0.63" | 630 m || 
|-id=687 bgcolor=#fefefe
| 541687 ||  || — || October 23, 2011 || Haleakala || Pan-STARRS || H || align=right data-sort-value="0.43" | 430 m || 
|-id=688 bgcolor=#d6d6d6
| 541688 ||  || — || December 11, 2004 || Kitt Peak || Spacewatch || 3:2 || align=right | 3.1 km || 
|-id=689 bgcolor=#E9E9E9
| 541689 ||  || — || October 24, 2011 || Haleakala || Pan-STARRS ||  || align=right | 1.2 km || 
|-id=690 bgcolor=#E9E9E9
| 541690 ||  || — || October 26, 2011 || Haleakala || Pan-STARRS ||  || align=right data-sort-value="0.90" | 900 m || 
|-id=691 bgcolor=#E9E9E9
| 541691 Ranschburg ||  ||  || October 5, 2011 || Piszkesteto || K. Sárneczky || EUN || align=right | 1.4 km || 
|-id=692 bgcolor=#E9E9E9
| 541692 ||  || — || November 15, 2011 || Kitt Peak || Spacewatch ||  || align=right data-sort-value="0.84" | 840 m || 
|-id=693 bgcolor=#E9E9E9
| 541693 ||  || — || November 8, 2011 || Haleakala || Pan-STARRS ||  || align=right data-sort-value="0.89" | 890 m || 
|-id=694 bgcolor=#E9E9E9
| 541694 ||  || — || November 16, 2011 || Mount Lemmon || Mount Lemmon Survey ||  || align=right data-sort-value="0.90" | 900 m || 
|-id=695 bgcolor=#E9E9E9
| 541695 ||  || — || November 16, 2011 || Mount Lemmon || Mount Lemmon Survey ||  || align=right | 1.5 km || 
|-id=696 bgcolor=#E9E9E9
| 541696 ||  || — || October 28, 2011 || Mount Lemmon || Mount Lemmon Survey ||  || align=right | 1.2 km || 
|-id=697 bgcolor=#E9E9E9
| 541697 ||  || — || November 11, 2007 || Mount Lemmon || Mount Lemmon Survey ||  || align=right data-sort-value="0.98" | 980 m || 
|-id=698 bgcolor=#E9E9E9
| 541698 ||  || — || August 29, 2006 || Anderson Mesa || LONEOS ||  || align=right | 2.1 km || 
|-id=699 bgcolor=#E9E9E9
| 541699 ||  || — || October 24, 2011 || Haleakala || Pan-STARRS ||  || align=right data-sort-value="0.65" | 650 m || 
|-id=700 bgcolor=#E9E9E9
| 541700 ||  || — || October 30, 2011 || Kitt Peak || Spacewatch ||  || align=right data-sort-value="0.75" | 750 m || 
|}

541701–541800 

|-bgcolor=#E9E9E9
| 541701 ||  || — || July 12, 2002 || Palomar || NEAT ||  || align=right | 1.2 km || 
|-id=702 bgcolor=#E9E9E9
| 541702 ||  || — || November 5, 2007 || Kitt Peak || Spacewatch ||  || align=right data-sort-value="0.80" | 800 m || 
|-id=703 bgcolor=#E9E9E9
| 541703 ||  || — || November 13, 2007 || Kitt Peak || Spacewatch || EUN || align=right data-sort-value="0.77" | 770 m || 
|-id=704 bgcolor=#E9E9E9
| 541704 ||  || — || November 18, 2011 || Catalina || CSS ||  || align=right | 1.0 km || 
|-id=705 bgcolor=#fefefe
| 541705 ||  || — || October 26, 2011 || Haleakala || Pan-STARRS || H || align=right data-sort-value="0.56" | 560 m || 
|-id=706 bgcolor=#d6d6d6
| 541706 ||  || — || November 3, 2011 || Mayhill-ISON || ISON ||  || align=right | 2.5 km || 
|-id=707 bgcolor=#E9E9E9
| 541707 ||  || — || October 26, 2011 || Haleakala || Pan-STARRS ||  || align=right data-sort-value="0.82" | 820 m || 
|-id=708 bgcolor=#fefefe
| 541708 ||  || — || September 24, 2011 || Mount Lemmon || Mount Lemmon Survey || H || align=right data-sort-value="0.65" | 650 m || 
|-id=709 bgcolor=#E9E9E9
| 541709 ||  || — || September 3, 2002 || Palomar || NEAT || EUN || align=right | 1.2 km || 
|-id=710 bgcolor=#fefefe
| 541710 ||  || — || November 23, 2011 || Kitt Peak || Spacewatch || H || align=right data-sort-value="0.75" | 750 m || 
|-id=711 bgcolor=#E9E9E9
| 541711 ||  || — || November 2, 2007 || Kitt Peak || Spacewatch ||  || align=right data-sort-value="0.54" | 540 m || 
|-id=712 bgcolor=#E9E9E9
| 541712 ||  || — || October 28, 2011 || Kitt Peak || Spacewatch ||  || align=right data-sort-value="0.98" | 980 m || 
|-id=713 bgcolor=#fefefe
| 541713 ||  || — || November 2, 2011 || Kitt Peak || Spacewatch ||  || align=right data-sort-value="0.83" | 830 m || 
|-id=714 bgcolor=#E9E9E9
| 541714 ||  || — || November 9, 2007 || Kitt Peak || Spacewatch ||  || align=right data-sort-value="0.65" | 650 m || 
|-id=715 bgcolor=#E9E9E9
| 541715 ||  || — || November 16, 2011 || Kitt Peak || Spacewatch ||  || align=right data-sort-value="0.86" | 860 m || 
|-id=716 bgcolor=#d6d6d6
| 541716 ||  || — || March 26, 2009 || Mount Lemmon || Mount Lemmon Survey ||  || align=right | 3.2 km || 
|-id=717 bgcolor=#E9E9E9
| 541717 ||  || — || November 25, 2011 || Haleakala || Pan-STARRS ||  || align=right | 1.9 km || 
|-id=718 bgcolor=#E9E9E9
| 541718 ||  || — || December 3, 2007 || Kitt Peak || Spacewatch ||  || align=right | 1.2 km || 
|-id=719 bgcolor=#E9E9E9
| 541719 ||  || — || October 23, 2011 || Haleakala || Pan-STARRS ||  || align=right data-sort-value="0.86" | 860 m || 
|-id=720 bgcolor=#E9E9E9
| 541720 ||  || — || November 26, 2011 || XuYi || PMO NEO ||  || align=right | 1.00 km || 
|-id=721 bgcolor=#fefefe
| 541721 ||  || — || October 31, 2011 || XuYi || PMO NEO || H || align=right data-sort-value="0.75" | 750 m || 
|-id=722 bgcolor=#E9E9E9
| 541722 ||  || — || May 4, 2005 || Mauna Kea || Mauna Kea Obs. ||  || align=right data-sort-value="0.74" | 740 m || 
|-id=723 bgcolor=#E9E9E9
| 541723 ||  || — || November 11, 2007 || Socorro || LINEAR ||  || align=right | 2.2 km || 
|-id=724 bgcolor=#E9E9E9
| 541724 ||  || — || November 23, 2011 || Mount Lemmon || Mount Lemmon Survey ||  || align=right | 1.2 km || 
|-id=725 bgcolor=#E9E9E9
| 541725 ||  || — || November 25, 2011 || Haleakala || Pan-STARRS ||  || align=right data-sort-value="0.98" | 980 m || 
|-id=726 bgcolor=#E9E9E9
| 541726 ||  || — || November 24, 2011 || Mount Lemmon || Mount Lemmon Survey ||  || align=right | 1.1 km || 
|-id=727 bgcolor=#E9E9E9
| 541727 ||  || — || November 26, 2011 || Mount Lemmon || Mount Lemmon Survey ||  || align=right | 1.3 km || 
|-id=728 bgcolor=#E9E9E9
| 541728 ||  || — || October 20, 2011 || Haleakala || Pan-STARRS ||  || align=right data-sort-value="0.59" | 590 m || 
|-id=729 bgcolor=#E9E9E9
| 541729 ||  || — || November 15, 2007 || Mount Lemmon || Mount Lemmon Survey ||  || align=right data-sort-value="0.98" | 980 m || 
|-id=730 bgcolor=#d6d6d6
| 541730 ||  || — || October 20, 2003 || Kitt Peak || Spacewatch || SHU3:2 || align=right | 3.9 km || 
|-id=731 bgcolor=#E9E9E9
| 541731 ||  || — || October 29, 2011 || Kitt Peak || Spacewatch ||  || align=right | 1.4 km || 
|-id=732 bgcolor=#E9E9E9
| 541732 ||  || — || November 28, 2011 || Haleakala || Pan-STARRS ||  || align=right data-sort-value="0.98" | 980 m || 
|-id=733 bgcolor=#E9E9E9
| 541733 ||  || — || March 17, 2009 || Kitt Peak || Spacewatch ||  || align=right | 1.6 km || 
|-id=734 bgcolor=#E9E9E9
| 541734 ||  || — || September 11, 2002 || Haleakala || AMOS ||  || align=right | 1.5 km || 
|-id=735 bgcolor=#E9E9E9
| 541735 ||  || — || November 18, 2011 || Mount Lemmon || Mount Lemmon Survey ||  || align=right | 1.4 km || 
|-id=736 bgcolor=#E9E9E9
| 541736 ||  || — || November 28, 2011 || Kitt Peak || Spacewatch ||  || align=right data-sort-value="0.68" | 680 m || 
|-id=737 bgcolor=#E9E9E9
| 541737 ||  || — || November 28, 2011 || Haleakala || Pan-STARRS ||  || align=right data-sort-value="0.98" | 980 m || 
|-id=738 bgcolor=#E9E9E9
| 541738 ||  || — || November 29, 2011 || Kitt Peak || Spacewatch ||  || align=right data-sort-value="0.83" | 830 m || 
|-id=739 bgcolor=#E9E9E9
| 541739 ||  || — || July 31, 2006 || Siding Spring || SSS ||  || align=right | 1.1 km || 
|-id=740 bgcolor=#E9E9E9
| 541740 ||  || — || November 18, 2011 || Mount Lemmon || Mount Lemmon Survey ||  || align=right | 1.0 km || 
|-id=741 bgcolor=#E9E9E9
| 541741 ||  || — || November 8, 2011 || Haleakala || Pan-STARRS ||  || align=right | 1.1 km || 
|-id=742 bgcolor=#E9E9E9
| 541742 ||  || — || January 1, 2008 || Mount Lemmon || Mount Lemmon Survey ||  || align=right | 1.1 km || 
|-id=743 bgcolor=#fefefe
| 541743 ||  || — || October 22, 2011 || Kitt Peak || Spacewatch || H || align=right data-sort-value="0.78" | 780 m || 
|-id=744 bgcolor=#E9E9E9
| 541744 ||  || — || September 5, 2010 || Mount Lemmon || Mount Lemmon Survey ||  || align=right | 1.1 km || 
|-id=745 bgcolor=#E9E9E9
| 541745 ||  || — || December 5, 2007 || Mount Lemmon || Mount Lemmon Survey ||  || align=right | 1.1 km || 
|-id=746 bgcolor=#E9E9E9
| 541746 ||  || — || November 3, 2011 || Mount Lemmon || Mount Lemmon Survey ||  || align=right data-sort-value="0.87" | 870 m || 
|-id=747 bgcolor=#fefefe
| 541747 ||  || — || November 24, 2011 || Mount Lemmon || Mount Lemmon Survey || H || align=right data-sort-value="0.68" | 680 m || 
|-id=748 bgcolor=#E9E9E9
| 541748 ||  || — || November 30, 2011 || Mount Lemmon || Mount Lemmon Survey ||  || align=right data-sort-value="0.91" | 910 m || 
|-id=749 bgcolor=#E9E9E9
| 541749 ||  || — || November 17, 2011 || Kitt Peak || Spacewatch ||  || align=right data-sort-value="0.90" | 900 m || 
|-id=750 bgcolor=#fefefe
| 541750 ||  || — || November 17, 2011 || Mount Lemmon || Mount Lemmon Survey || H || align=right data-sort-value="0.64" | 640 m || 
|-id=751 bgcolor=#E9E9E9
| 541751 ||  || — || October 18, 2011 || Mount Lemmon || Mount Lemmon Survey || (5) || align=right data-sort-value="0.59" | 590 m || 
|-id=752 bgcolor=#fefefe
| 541752 ||  || — || October 21, 2011 || Kitt Peak || Spacewatch ||  || align=right data-sort-value="0.80" | 800 m || 
|-id=753 bgcolor=#E9E9E9
| 541753 ||  || — || November 16, 2011 || Kitt Peak || Spacewatch ||  || align=right | 1.8 km || 
|-id=754 bgcolor=#E9E9E9
| 541754 ||  || — || December 18, 2007 || Kitt Peak || Spacewatch ||  || align=right | 1.1 km || 
|-id=755 bgcolor=#E9E9E9
| 541755 ||  || — || October 3, 2011 || La Sagra || OAM Obs. || EUN || align=right | 1.1 km || 
|-id=756 bgcolor=#fefefe
| 541756 ||  || — || September 14, 2007 || Catalina || CSS ||  || align=right data-sort-value="0.76" | 760 m || 
|-id=757 bgcolor=#E9E9E9
| 541757 ||  || — || November 1, 2011 || Catalina || CSS ||  || align=right | 1.0 km || 
|-id=758 bgcolor=#E9E9E9
| 541758 ||  || — || November 24, 2011 || Palomar || PTF ||  || align=right | 1.00 km || 
|-id=759 bgcolor=#E9E9E9
| 541759 ||  || — || October 23, 2011 || Haleakala || Pan-STARRS ||  || align=right | 1.1 km || 
|-id=760 bgcolor=#E9E9E9
| 541760 ||  || — || February 24, 2012 || Mount Lemmon || Mount Lemmon Survey ||  || align=right | 1.2 km || 
|-id=761 bgcolor=#E9E9E9
| 541761 ||  || — || November 28, 2011 || Palomar || PTF ||  || align=right data-sort-value="0.95" | 950 m || 
|-id=762 bgcolor=#E9E9E9
| 541762 ||  || — || December 4, 2007 || Catalina || CSS ||  || align=right | 2.2 km || 
|-id=763 bgcolor=#E9E9E9
| 541763 ||  || — || November 28, 2011 || Mount Lemmon || Mount Lemmon Survey ||  || align=right | 1.4 km || 
|-id=764 bgcolor=#E9E9E9
| 541764 ||  || — || November 17, 2011 || Mount Lemmon || Mount Lemmon Survey ||  || align=right data-sort-value="0.83" | 830 m || 
|-id=765 bgcolor=#E9E9E9
| 541765 ||  || — || November 24, 2011 || Mount Lemmon || Mount Lemmon Survey ||  || align=right data-sort-value="0.83" | 830 m || 
|-id=766 bgcolor=#E9E9E9
| 541766 ||  || — || November 30, 2011 || Mount Lemmon || Mount Lemmon Survey ||  || align=right | 1.1 km || 
|-id=767 bgcolor=#E9E9E9
| 541767 ||  || — || November 27, 2011 || Kitt Peak || Spacewatch ||  || align=right data-sort-value="0.93" | 930 m || 
|-id=768 bgcolor=#fefefe
| 541768 ||  || — || May 14, 2010 || Mount Lemmon || Mount Lemmon Survey || H || align=right data-sort-value="0.81" | 810 m || 
|-id=769 bgcolor=#fefefe
| 541769 ||  || — || June 11, 2010 || Mount Lemmon || Mount Lemmon Survey || H || align=right data-sort-value="0.67" | 670 m || 
|-id=770 bgcolor=#E9E9E9
| 541770 ||  || — || November 24, 2011 || Mount Lemmon || Mount Lemmon Survey ||  || align=right | 1.2 km || 
|-id=771 bgcolor=#E9E9E9
| 541771 ||  || — || December 24, 2011 || Catalina || CSS ||  || align=right | 1.8 km || 
|-id=772 bgcolor=#E9E9E9
| 541772 ||  || — || November 18, 2011 || Mount Lemmon || Mount Lemmon Survey ||  || align=right data-sort-value="0.93" | 930 m || 
|-id=773 bgcolor=#E9E9E9
| 541773 ||  || — || January 1, 2008 || Kitt Peak || Spacewatch ||  || align=right | 1.1 km || 
|-id=774 bgcolor=#E9E9E9
| 541774 ||  || — || December 16, 2011 || Mount Lemmon || Mount Lemmon Survey ||  || align=right | 1.3 km || 
|-id=775 bgcolor=#E9E9E9
| 541775 ||  || — || November 4, 2002 || Palomar || NEAT ||  || align=right | 1.3 km || 
|-id=776 bgcolor=#fefefe
| 541776 Oláhkatalin ||  ||  || November 7, 2011 || Piszkesteto || K. Vida, K. Sárneczky ||  || align=right data-sort-value="0.99" | 990 m || 
|-id=777 bgcolor=#E9E9E9
| 541777 ||  || — || December 26, 2011 || Mallemort || Les Engarouines Obs. ||  || align=right | 1.5 km || 
|-id=778 bgcolor=#E9E9E9
| 541778 ||  || — || December 26, 2011 || Oukaimeden || Oukaïmeden Obs. ||  || align=right data-sort-value="0.91" | 910 m || 
|-id=779 bgcolor=#E9E9E9
| 541779 ||  || — || December 27, 2011 || Santa Maria de Montmagastrell || J. M. Bosch, R. M. Olivera ||  || align=right data-sort-value="0.79" | 790 m || 
|-id=780 bgcolor=#E9E9E9
| 541780 ||  || — || December 5, 2007 || Kitt Peak || Spacewatch ||  || align=right data-sort-value="0.54" | 540 m || 
|-id=781 bgcolor=#fefefe
| 541781 ||  || — || January 18, 2009 || Kitt Peak || Spacewatch ||  || align=right data-sort-value="0.81" | 810 m || 
|-id=782 bgcolor=#E9E9E9
| 541782 ||  || — || December 27, 2011 || Mount Lemmon || Mount Lemmon Survey ||  || align=right data-sort-value="0.90" | 900 m || 
|-id=783 bgcolor=#E9E9E9
| 541783 ||  || — || December 25, 2011 || Kitt Peak || Spacewatch ||  || align=right | 1.1 km || 
|-id=784 bgcolor=#E9E9E9
| 541784 ||  || — || August 19, 2002 || Palomar || NEAT ||  || align=right | 1.1 km || 
|-id=785 bgcolor=#E9E9E9
| 541785 ||  || — || December 24, 2011 || Mount Lemmon || Mount Lemmon Survey ||  || align=right | 1.7 km || 
|-id=786 bgcolor=#E9E9E9
| 541786 ||  || — || February 14, 2008 || Catalina || CSS ||  || align=right data-sort-value="0.95" | 950 m || 
|-id=787 bgcolor=#E9E9E9
| 541787 ||  || — || November 27, 2011 || Mount Lemmon || Mount Lemmon Survey ||  || align=right | 1.3 km || 
|-id=788 bgcolor=#E9E9E9
| 541788 ||  || — || December 26, 2011 || Kitt Peak || Spacewatch ||  || align=right | 2.0 km || 
|-id=789 bgcolor=#E9E9E9
| 541789 ||  || — || November 14, 2002 || Palomar || NEAT ||  || align=right | 2.4 km || 
|-id=790 bgcolor=#fefefe
| 541790 ||  || — || November 22, 2011 || Mount Lemmon || Mount Lemmon Survey || H || align=right data-sort-value="0.84" | 840 m || 
|-id=791 bgcolor=#E9E9E9
| 541791 ||  || — || March 12, 2008 || Catalina || CSS ||  || align=right | 1.1 km || 
|-id=792 bgcolor=#E9E9E9
| 541792 ||  || — || December 16, 2011 || Mount Lemmon || Mount Lemmon Survey ||  || align=right | 2.1 km || 
|-id=793 bgcolor=#E9E9E9
| 541793 ||  || — || March 1, 2008 || Catalina || CSS ||  || align=right | 1.5 km || 
|-id=794 bgcolor=#E9E9E9
| 541794 ||  || — || February 11, 2008 || Kitt Peak || Spacewatch ||  || align=right data-sort-value="0.96" | 960 m || 
|-id=795 bgcolor=#E9E9E9
| 541795 ||  || — || January 10, 2008 || Mount Lemmon || Mount Lemmon Survey ||  || align=right | 1.4 km || 
|-id=796 bgcolor=#E9E9E9
| 541796 ||  || — || February 28, 2008 || Kitt Peak || Spacewatch ||  || align=right | 1.3 km || 
|-id=797 bgcolor=#E9E9E9
| 541797 ||  || — || December 28, 2007 || Kitt Peak || Spacewatch ||  || align=right | 1.4 km || 
|-id=798 bgcolor=#fefefe
| 541798 ||  || — || December 27, 2011 || Mayhill-ISON || ISON || H || align=right data-sort-value="0.60" | 600 m || 
|-id=799 bgcolor=#E9E9E9
| 541799 ||  || — || December 26, 2011 || Kitt Peak || Spacewatch ||  || align=right | 1.9 km || 
|-id=800 bgcolor=#E9E9E9
| 541800 ||  || — || December 31, 2011 || Kitt Peak || Spacewatch ||  || align=right data-sort-value="0.78" | 780 m || 
|}

541801–541900 

|-bgcolor=#E9E9E9
| 541801 ||  || — || March 16, 2004 || Mauna Kea || Mauna Kea Obs. ||  || align=right data-sort-value="0.71" | 710 m || 
|-id=802 bgcolor=#E9E9E9
| 541802 ||  || — || November 23, 2006 || Mount Lemmon || Mount Lemmon Survey ||  || align=right | 1.3 km || 
|-id=803 bgcolor=#E9E9E9
| 541803 ||  || — || January 20, 2008 || Mount Lemmon || Mount Lemmon Survey ||  || align=right | 1.2 km || 
|-id=804 bgcolor=#E9E9E9
| 541804 ||  || — || September 13, 2006 || Bergisch Gladbach || Bergisch Gladbach Obs. ||  || align=right | 1.4 km || 
|-id=805 bgcolor=#E9E9E9
| 541805 ||  || — || February 10, 2008 || Kitt Peak || Spacewatch ||  || align=right | 1.3 km || 
|-id=806 bgcolor=#E9E9E9
| 541806 ||  || — || December 29, 2011 || Mount Lemmon || Mount Lemmon Survey ||  || align=right | 1.1 km || 
|-id=807 bgcolor=#E9E9E9
| 541807 ||  || — || November 28, 2011 || Mount Lemmon || Mount Lemmon Survey ||  || align=right | 1.8 km || 
|-id=808 bgcolor=#fefefe
| 541808 ||  || — || October 27, 2011 || Mount Lemmon || Mount Lemmon Survey ||  || align=right | 1.0 km || 
|-id=809 bgcolor=#E9E9E9
| 541809 ||  || — || February 9, 2008 || Mount Lemmon || Mount Lemmon Survey ||  || align=right | 1.5 km || 
|-id=810 bgcolor=#E9E9E9
| 541810 ||  || — || December 30, 2011 || Kitt Peak || Spacewatch ||  || align=right | 1.3 km || 
|-id=811 bgcolor=#FA8072
| 541811 ||  || — || January 2, 2012 || Catalina || CSS ||  || align=right data-sort-value="0.71" | 710 m || 
|-id=812 bgcolor=#E9E9E9
| 541812 ||  || — || January 2, 2012 || Kitt Peak || Spacewatch ||  || align=right | 1.2 km || 
|-id=813 bgcolor=#E9E9E9
| 541813 ||  || — || December 31, 2007 || Kitt Peak || Spacewatch ||  || align=right data-sort-value="0.94" | 940 m || 
|-id=814 bgcolor=#E9E9E9
| 541814 ||  || — || January 13, 2008 || Kitt Peak || Spacewatch ||  || align=right data-sort-value="0.98" | 980 m || 
|-id=815 bgcolor=#E9E9E9
| 541815 ||  || — || March 2, 2008 || Mount Lemmon || Mount Lemmon Survey ||  || align=right | 1.1 km || 
|-id=816 bgcolor=#fefefe
| 541816 ||  || — || January 17, 2004 || Kitt Peak || Spacewatch || H || align=right data-sort-value="0.71" | 710 m || 
|-id=817 bgcolor=#E9E9E9
| 541817 ||  || — || January 4, 2012 || Mount Lemmon || Mount Lemmon Survey ||  || align=right | 1.8 km || 
|-id=818 bgcolor=#fefefe
| 541818 ||  || — || January 30, 2004 || Catalina || CSS || H || align=right | 1.00 km || 
|-id=819 bgcolor=#E9E9E9
| 541819 ||  || — || April 7, 2008 || Mount Lemmon || Mount Lemmon Survey ||  || align=right | 1.5 km || 
|-id=820 bgcolor=#E9E9E9
| 541820 ||  || — || October 17, 2006 || Catalina || CSS ||  || align=right | 1.7 km || 
|-id=821 bgcolor=#E9E9E9
| 541821 ||  || — || January 3, 2003 || Catalina Sky Survey || La Silla Obs. || EUN || align=right | 1.2 km || 
|-id=822 bgcolor=#E9E9E9
| 541822 ||  || — || January 15, 2008 || Mount Lemmon || Mount Lemmon Survey ||  || align=right data-sort-value="0.93" | 930 m || 
|-id=823 bgcolor=#E9E9E9
| 541823 ||  || — || February 12, 2008 || Mount Lemmon || Mount Lemmon Survey ||  || align=right data-sort-value="0.81" | 810 m || 
|-id=824 bgcolor=#E9E9E9
| 541824 ||  || — || January 1, 2008 || Catalina || CSS ||  || align=right | 1.6 km || 
|-id=825 bgcolor=#E9E9E9
| 541825 ||  || — || December 16, 2011 || Mount Lemmon || Mount Lemmon Survey ||  || align=right | 1.6 km || 
|-id=826 bgcolor=#E9E9E9
| 541826 ||  || — || February 29, 2012 || Mount Lemmon || Mount Lemmon Survey ||  || align=right | 1.0 km || 
|-id=827 bgcolor=#E9E9E9
| 541827 ||  || — || December 31, 2007 || Kitt Peak || Spacewatch ||  || align=right | 1.1 km || 
|-id=828 bgcolor=#E9E9E9
| 541828 ||  || — || October 17, 2010 || Mount Lemmon || Mount Lemmon Survey ||  || align=right | 1.6 km || 
|-id=829 bgcolor=#E9E9E9
| 541829 ||  || — || January 5, 2012 || Haleakala || Pan-STARRS ||  || align=right | 2.0 km || 
|-id=830 bgcolor=#E9E9E9
| 541830 ||  || — || January 5, 2012 || Haleakala || Pan-STARRS ||  || align=right | 2.2 km || 
|-id=831 bgcolor=#E9E9E9
| 541831 ||  || — || January 4, 2012 || Mount Lemmon || Mount Lemmon Survey ||  || align=right | 1.4 km || 
|-id=832 bgcolor=#E9E9E9
| 541832 ||  || — || March 13, 2008 || Kitt Peak || Spacewatch ||  || align=right | 1.8 km || 
|-id=833 bgcolor=#E9E9E9
| 541833 ||  || — || April 11, 2008 || Mount Lemmon || Mount Lemmon Survey ||  || align=right | 1.7 km || 
|-id=834 bgcolor=#E9E9E9
| 541834 ||  || — || January 18, 2012 || Kitt Peak || Spacewatch ||  || align=right | 1.6 km || 
|-id=835 bgcolor=#E9E9E9
| 541835 ||  || — || January 17, 2012 || Mallemort || Les Engarouines Obs. ||  || align=right | 2.4 km || 
|-id=836 bgcolor=#E9E9E9
| 541836 ||  || — || December 18, 2011 || Mallemort || Les Engarouines Obs. ||  || align=right | 2.7 km || 
|-id=837 bgcolor=#E9E9E9
| 541837 ||  || — || December 31, 2007 || Mount Lemmon || Mount Lemmon Survey ||  || align=right data-sort-value="0.78" | 780 m || 
|-id=838 bgcolor=#E9E9E9
| 541838 ||  || — || October 12, 2010 || Mount Lemmon || Mount Lemmon Survey ||  || align=right | 2.1 km || 
|-id=839 bgcolor=#E9E9E9
| 541839 ||  || — || February 9, 2008 || Catalina || CSS ||  || align=right | 1.1 km || 
|-id=840 bgcolor=#E9E9E9
| 541840 ||  || — || December 21, 2011 || Mt. Lemmon Survey || Črni Vrh ||  || align=right | 1.5 km || 
|-id=841 bgcolor=#E9E9E9
| 541841 ||  || — || September 11, 2001 || Anderson Mesa || LONEOS ||  || align=right | 2.5 km || 
|-id=842 bgcolor=#E9E9E9
| 541842 Amygreaves ||  ||  || January 18, 2012 || Mayhill || N. Falla ||  || align=right | 1.4 km || 
|-id=843 bgcolor=#E9E9E9
| 541843 ||  || — || November 3, 2010 || Mount Lemmon || Mount Lemmon Survey ||  || align=right | 2.0 km || 
|-id=844 bgcolor=#E9E9E9
| 541844 ||  || — || October 25, 2007 || Mount Lemmon || Mount Lemmon Survey || JUN || align=right | 1.1 km || 
|-id=845 bgcolor=#E9E9E9
| 541845 ||  || — || January 19, 2012 || Catalina || CSS ||  || align=right | 1.3 km || 
|-id=846 bgcolor=#E9E9E9
| 541846 ||  || — || January 6, 2012 || Kitt Peak || Spacewatch ||  || align=right data-sort-value="0.90" | 900 m || 
|-id=847 bgcolor=#E9E9E9
| 541847 ||  || — || January 19, 2012 || Mount Lemmon || Mount Lemmon Survey ||  || align=right | 1.1 km || 
|-id=848 bgcolor=#E9E9E9
| 541848 ||  || — || January 20, 2012 || Mount Lemmon || Mount Lemmon Survey ||  || align=right | 1.2 km || 
|-id=849 bgcolor=#E9E9E9
| 541849 ||  || — || January 21, 2012 || Kitt Peak || Spacewatch || ADE || align=right | 1.7 km || 
|-id=850 bgcolor=#E9E9E9
| 541850 ||  || — || January 21, 2012 || Kitt Peak || Spacewatch ||  || align=right | 2.1 km || 
|-id=851 bgcolor=#E9E9E9
| 541851 ||  || — || October 12, 2006 || Palomar || NEAT ||  || align=right | 1.3 km || 
|-id=852 bgcolor=#FA8072
| 541852 ||  || — || January 25, 2012 || Haleakala || Pan-STARRS ||  || align=right | 1.1 km || 
|-id=853 bgcolor=#fefefe
| 541853 ||  || — || January 26, 2012 || Crni Vrh || Črni Vrh || H || align=right data-sort-value="0.71" | 710 m || 
|-id=854 bgcolor=#E9E9E9
| 541854 ||  || — || October 3, 2006 || Mount Lemmon || Mount Lemmon Survey ||  || align=right | 1.6 km || 
|-id=855 bgcolor=#E9E9E9
| 541855 ||  || — || March 5, 2008 || Mount Lemmon || Mount Lemmon Survey ||  || align=right | 1.3 km || 
|-id=856 bgcolor=#E9E9E9
| 541856 ||  || — || March 26, 2008 || Mount Lemmon || Mount Lemmon Survey ||  || align=right | 1.0 km || 
|-id=857 bgcolor=#E9E9E9
| 541857 ||  || — || January 21, 2012 || Kitt Peak || Spacewatch ||  || align=right data-sort-value="0.96" | 960 m || 
|-id=858 bgcolor=#E9E9E9
| 541858 ||  || — || January 21, 2012 || Kitt Peak || Spacewatch ||  || align=right | 1.1 km || 
|-id=859 bgcolor=#E9E9E9
| 541859 ||  || — || January 21, 2012 || Kitt Peak || Spacewatch ||  || align=right | 1.6 km || 
|-id=860 bgcolor=#E9E9E9
| 541860 ||  || — || December 31, 2011 || Kitt Peak || Spacewatch ||  || align=right | 1.8 km || 
|-id=861 bgcolor=#E9E9E9
| 541861 ||  || — || January 31, 2008 || Mount Lemmon || Mount Lemmon Survey ||  || align=right data-sort-value="0.76" | 760 m || 
|-id=862 bgcolor=#E9E9E9
| 541862 ||  || — || January 27, 2012 || Mount Lemmon || Mount Lemmon Survey ||  || align=right data-sort-value="0.94" | 940 m || 
|-id=863 bgcolor=#E9E9E9
| 541863 ||  || — || August 15, 2006 || Lulin || LUSS ||  || align=right | 1.0 km || 
|-id=864 bgcolor=#E9E9E9
| 541864 ||  || — || December 30, 2011 || Mount Lemmon || Mount Lemmon Survey ||  || align=right | 1.3 km || 
|-id=865 bgcolor=#E9E9E9
| 541865 ||  || — || March 2, 2008 || Mount Lemmon || Mount Lemmon Survey ||  || align=right | 1.0 km || 
|-id=866 bgcolor=#E9E9E9
| 541866 ||  || — || August 16, 2009 || Kitt Peak || Spacewatch ||  || align=right | 2.1 km || 
|-id=867 bgcolor=#E9E9E9
| 541867 ||  || — || November 22, 2011 || Mount Lemmon || Mount Lemmon Survey ||  || align=right | 1.1 km || 
|-id=868 bgcolor=#E9E9E9
| 541868 ||  || — || January 25, 2012 || Catalina || CSS ||  || align=right | 1.5 km || 
|-id=869 bgcolor=#E9E9E9
| 541869 ||  || — || January 25, 2012 || Haleakala || Pan-STARRS ||  || align=right | 1.9 km || 
|-id=870 bgcolor=#E9E9E9
| 541870 ||  || — || January 27, 2012 || Mount Lemmon || Mount Lemmon Survey ||  || align=right | 2.2 km || 
|-id=871 bgcolor=#E9E9E9
| 541871 ||  || — || January 27, 2012 || Mount Lemmon || Mount Lemmon Survey ||  || align=right | 1.8 km || 
|-id=872 bgcolor=#E9E9E9
| 541872 ||  || — || January 27, 2012 || Mount Lemmon || Mount Lemmon Survey ||  || align=right data-sort-value="0.85" | 850 m || 
|-id=873 bgcolor=#E9E9E9
| 541873 ||  || — || January 21, 2012 || Kitt Peak || Spacewatch ||  || align=right | 1.3 km || 
|-id=874 bgcolor=#E9E9E9
| 541874 ||  || — || January 21, 2012 || Kitt Peak || Spacewatch || (5) || align=right data-sort-value="0.68" | 680 m || 
|-id=875 bgcolor=#fefefe
| 541875 ||  || — || January 19, 2012 || Kitt Peak || Spacewatch || H || align=right data-sort-value="0.52" | 520 m || 
|-id=876 bgcolor=#E9E9E9
| 541876 ||  || — || February 2, 2008 || Kitt Peak || Spacewatch ||  || align=right | 1.4 km || 
|-id=877 bgcolor=#E9E9E9
| 541877 ||  || — || January 8, 1994 || Kitt Peak || Spacewatch ||  || align=right | 2.3 km || 
|-id=878 bgcolor=#E9E9E9
| 541878 Jessicatallulah ||  ||  || January 18, 2012 || Mayhill || N. Falla || EUN || align=right | 1.0 km || 
|-id=879 bgcolor=#E9E9E9
| 541879 ||  || — || October 15, 2002 || Palomar || NEAT ||  || align=right | 1.5 km || 
|-id=880 bgcolor=#fefefe
| 541880 ||  || — || January 29, 2004 || Anderson Mesa || LONEOS || H || align=right data-sort-value="0.94" | 940 m || 
|-id=881 bgcolor=#d6d6d6
| 541881 ||  || — || November 12, 2005 || Kitt Peak || Spacewatch ||  || align=right | 2.3 km || 
|-id=882 bgcolor=#E9E9E9
| 541882 ||  || — || November 12, 2007 || Mount Lemmon || Mount Lemmon Survey ||  || align=right | 1.2 km || 
|-id=883 bgcolor=#E9E9E9
| 541883 ||  || — || January 25, 2012 || Haleakala || Pan-STARRS ||  || align=right | 1.8 km || 
|-id=884 bgcolor=#E9E9E9
| 541884 ||  || — || December 25, 2011 || Kitt Peak || Spacewatch || EUN || align=right | 1.0 km || 
|-id=885 bgcolor=#E9E9E9
| 541885 ||  || — || March 15, 2008 || Mount Lemmon || Mount Lemmon Survey ||  || align=right data-sort-value="0.81" | 810 m || 
|-id=886 bgcolor=#E9E9E9
| 541886 ||  || — || January 21, 2012 || Haleakala || Pan-STARRS || EUN || align=right | 1.0 km || 
|-id=887 bgcolor=#E9E9E9
| 541887 ||  || — || February 11, 2008 || Mount Lemmon || Mount Lemmon Survey ||  || align=right | 1.6 km || 
|-id=888 bgcolor=#E9E9E9
| 541888 ||  || — || April 14, 2008 || Mount Lemmon || Mount Lemmon Survey ||  || align=right | 1.8 km || 
|-id=889 bgcolor=#E9E9E9
| 541889 ||  || — || March 13, 2008 || Catalina || CSS ||  || align=right | 1.8 km || 
|-id=890 bgcolor=#E9E9E9
| 541890 ||  || — || February 8, 2008 || Mount Lemmon || Mount Lemmon Survey ||  || align=right | 1.1 km || 
|-id=891 bgcolor=#E9E9E9
| 541891 ||  || — || October 28, 2006 || Mount Lemmon || Mount Lemmon Survey ||  || align=right | 1.0 km || 
|-id=892 bgcolor=#E9E9E9
| 541892 ||  || — || January 21, 2012 || Kitt Peak || Spacewatch ||  || align=right | 1.4 km || 
|-id=893 bgcolor=#E9E9E9
| 541893 ||  || — || January 21, 2012 || Kitt Peak || Spacewatch ||  || align=right | 1.5 km || 
|-id=894 bgcolor=#E9E9E9
| 541894 ||  || — || January 22, 2012 || Haleakala || Pan-STARRS ||  || align=right | 1.7 km || 
|-id=895 bgcolor=#E9E9E9
| 541895 ||  || — || September 16, 2006 || Kitt Peak || Spacewatch ||  || align=right | 1.3 km || 
|-id=896 bgcolor=#E9E9E9
| 541896 ||  || — || December 15, 2006 || Kitt Peak || Spacewatch ||  || align=right | 2.1 km || 
|-id=897 bgcolor=#E9E9E9
| 541897 TRAPPIST ||  ||  || February 1, 2012 || La Silla || E. Jehin ||  || align=right | 1.6 km || 
|-id=898 bgcolor=#E9E9E9
| 541898 ||  || — || February 1, 2012 || Kitt Peak || Spacewatch ||  || align=right | 2.2 km || 
|-id=899 bgcolor=#E9E9E9
| 541899 ||  || — || September 16, 2006 || Catalina || CSS ||  || align=right | 1.2 km || 
|-id=900 bgcolor=#E9E9E9
| 541900 ||  || — || October 7, 2005 || Kitt Peak || Spacewatch ||  || align=right | 1.9 km || 
|}

541901–542000 

|-bgcolor=#E9E9E9
| 541901 ||  || — || January 26, 2012 || Haleakala || Pan-STARRS ||  || align=right | 1.3 km || 
|-id=902 bgcolor=#E9E9E9
| 541902 ||  || — || January 4, 2012 || Mount Lemmon || Mount Lemmon Survey ||  || align=right | 1.7 km || 
|-id=903 bgcolor=#E9E9E9
| 541903 ||  || — || January 26, 2012 || Mount Lemmon || Mount Lemmon Survey ||  || align=right | 2.2 km || 
|-id=904 bgcolor=#fefefe
| 541904 ||  || — || February 4, 2012 || Haleakala || Pan-STARRS || H || align=right data-sort-value="0.76" | 760 m || 
|-id=905 bgcolor=#E9E9E9
| 541905 ||  || — || January 19, 2012 || Catalina || CSS ||  || align=right | 1.0 km || 
|-id=906 bgcolor=#E9E9E9
| 541906 ||  || — || October 10, 2001 || Palomar || NEAT || AEO || align=right | 1.3 km || 
|-id=907 bgcolor=#E9E9E9
| 541907 ||  || — || February 13, 2012 || Haleakala || Pan-STARRS ||  || align=right | 2.1 km || 
|-id=908 bgcolor=#E9E9E9
| 541908 ||  || — || March 29, 2008 || Kitt Peak || Spacewatch ||  || align=right | 1.3 km || 
|-id=909 bgcolor=#E9E9E9
| 541909 ||  || — || January 26, 2012 || Mount Lemmon || Mount Lemmon Survey ||  || align=right | 2.0 km || 
|-id=910 bgcolor=#fefefe
| 541910 ||  || — || June 17, 2010 || Mount Lemmon || Mount Lemmon Survey || H || align=right data-sort-value="0.78" | 780 m || 
|-id=911 bgcolor=#fefefe
| 541911 ||  || — || October 24, 2005 || Palomar || NEAT || H || align=right data-sort-value="0.82" | 820 m || 
|-id=912 bgcolor=#FA8072
| 541912 ||  || — || October 5, 2002 || Palomar || NEAT ||  || align=right | 1.6 km || 
|-id=913 bgcolor=#E9E9E9
| 541913 ||  || — || August 16, 2005 || Wrightwood || Table Mountain Obs. ||  || align=right | 1.3 km || 
|-id=914 bgcolor=#E9E9E9
| 541914 ||  || — || January 22, 2012 || Haleakala || Pan-STARRS ||  || align=right | 1.5 km || 
|-id=915 bgcolor=#E9E9E9
| 541915 ||  || — || February 10, 2007 || Mount Lemmon || Mount Lemmon Survey ||  || align=right | 2.7 km || 
|-id=916 bgcolor=#E9E9E9
| 541916 ||  || — || November 13, 2002 || Palomar || NEAT ||  || align=right | 1.2 km || 
|-id=917 bgcolor=#d6d6d6
| 541917 ||  || — || September 28, 2003 || Anderson Mesa || LONEOS ||  || align=right | 4.6 km || 
|-id=918 bgcolor=#fefefe
| 541918 ||  || — || February 13, 2008 || Mount Lemmon || Mount Lemmon Survey ||  || align=right data-sort-value="0.72" | 720 m || 
|-id=919 bgcolor=#E9E9E9
| 541919 ||  || — || April 16, 2008 || Mount Lemmon || Mount Lemmon Survey ||  || align=right | 2.8 km || 
|-id=920 bgcolor=#E9E9E9
| 541920 ||  || — || February 20, 2012 || Haleakala || Pan-STARRS ||  || align=right | 1.6 km || 
|-id=921 bgcolor=#E9E9E9
| 541921 ||  || — || December 1, 1996 || Kitt Peak || Spacewatch ||  || align=right | 2.2 km || 
|-id=922 bgcolor=#E9E9E9
| 541922 ||  || — || September 28, 2006 || Kitt Peak || Spacewatch ||  || align=right data-sort-value="0.80" | 800 m || 
|-id=923 bgcolor=#E9E9E9
| 541923 ||  || — || February 26, 2012 || Haleakala || Pan-STARRS ||  || align=right | 1.1 km || 
|-id=924 bgcolor=#E9E9E9
| 541924 ||  || — || October 1, 2005 || Kitt Peak || Spacewatch ||  || align=right | 2.2 km || 
|-id=925 bgcolor=#E9E9E9
| 541925 ||  || — || August 27, 2005 || Palomar || NEAT || HNS || align=right | 1.2 km || 
|-id=926 bgcolor=#E9E9E9
| 541926 ||  || — || February 14, 2012 || Haleakala || Pan-STARRS ||  || align=right | 1.6 km || 
|-id=927 bgcolor=#E9E9E9
| 541927 ||  || — || February 16, 2012 || Haleakala || Pan-STARRS ||  || align=right | 1.3 km || 
|-id=928 bgcolor=#E9E9E9
| 541928 ||  || — || October 28, 2006 || Catalina || CSS || JUN || align=right data-sort-value="0.99" | 990 m || 
|-id=929 bgcolor=#fefefe
| 541929 ||  || — || March 2, 2001 || Haleakala || AMOS || H || align=right data-sort-value="0.94" | 940 m || 
|-id=930 bgcolor=#E9E9E9
| 541930 ||  || — || February 26, 2012 || Catalina || CSS ||  || align=right | 2.7 km || 
|-id=931 bgcolor=#E9E9E9
| 541931 ||  || — || April 11, 2008 || Mount Lemmon || Mount Lemmon Survey ||  || align=right | 1.5 km || 
|-id=932 bgcolor=#E9E9E9
| 541932 ||  || — || February 27, 2012 || Haleakala || Pan-STARRS ||  || align=right | 1.5 km || 
|-id=933 bgcolor=#E9E9E9
| 541933 ||  || — || February 21, 2012 || Mount Lemmon || Mount Lemmon Survey ||  || align=right | 1.7 km || 
|-id=934 bgcolor=#E9E9E9
| 541934 ||  || — || February 16, 2012 || Haleakala || Pan-STARRS ||  || align=right | 1.7 km || 
|-id=935 bgcolor=#E9E9E9
| 541935 ||  || — || February 18, 2012 || Catalina || CSS ||  || align=right | 2.1 km || 
|-id=936 bgcolor=#E9E9E9
| 541936 ||  || — || February 21, 2012 || Kitt Peak || Spacewatch ||  || align=right | 2.2 km || 
|-id=937 bgcolor=#E9E9E9
| 541937 ||  || — || February 24, 2012 || Kitt Peak || Spacewatch ||  || align=right | 1.8 km || 
|-id=938 bgcolor=#E9E9E9
| 541938 ||  || — || September 2, 2010 || Mount Lemmon || Mount Lemmon Survey ||  || align=right | 1.5 km || 
|-id=939 bgcolor=#E9E9E9
| 541939 ||  || — || January 28, 2007 || Mount Lemmon || Mount Lemmon Survey ||  || align=right | 2.1 km || 
|-id=940 bgcolor=#d6d6d6
| 541940 ||  || — || February 26, 2012 || Kitt Peak || Spacewatch ||  || align=right | 2.3 km || 
|-id=941 bgcolor=#E9E9E9
| 541941 ||  || — || September 12, 2010 || Kitt Peak || Spacewatch ||  || align=right | 1.7 km || 
|-id=942 bgcolor=#d6d6d6
| 541942 ||  || — || February 28, 2012 || Haleakala || Pan-STARRS ||  || align=right | 2.4 km || 
|-id=943 bgcolor=#E9E9E9
| 541943 ||  || — || February 27, 2012 || Haleakala || Pan-STARRS ||  || align=right | 1.6 km || 
|-id=944 bgcolor=#E9E9E9
| 541944 ||  || — || July 29, 2005 || Palomar || NEAT || HNS || align=right | 1.5 km || 
|-id=945 bgcolor=#E9E9E9
| 541945 ||  || — || January 19, 2012 || Haleakala || Pan-STARRS ||  || align=right | 1.5 km || 
|-id=946 bgcolor=#E9E9E9
| 541946 ||  || — || March 13, 2012 || Mount Lemmon || Mount Lemmon Survey ||  || align=right | 1.5 km || 
|-id=947 bgcolor=#E9E9E9
| 541947 ||  || — || February 26, 2012 || Kitt Peak || Spacewatch ||  || align=right | 1.7 km || 
|-id=948 bgcolor=#E9E9E9
| 541948 ||  || — || December 13, 2006 || Kitt Peak || Spacewatch ||  || align=right | 2.0 km || 
|-id=949 bgcolor=#E9E9E9
| 541949 ||  || — || October 12, 2010 || Mount Lemmon || Mount Lemmon Survey ||  || align=right | 2.0 km || 
|-id=950 bgcolor=#E9E9E9
| 541950 ||  || — || November 17, 2006 || Mount Lemmon || Mount Lemmon Survey ||  || align=right | 1.6 km || 
|-id=951 bgcolor=#d6d6d6
| 541951 ||  || — || March 4, 2012 || Mount Lemmon || Mount Lemmon Survey ||  || align=right | 2.1 km || 
|-id=952 bgcolor=#E9E9E9
| 541952 ||  || — || May 2, 2003 || Kitt Peak || Spacewatch ||  || align=right | 2.3 km || 
|-id=953 bgcolor=#E9E9E9
| 541953 ||  || — || January 17, 2007 || Catalina || CSS ||  || align=right | 1.9 km || 
|-id=954 bgcolor=#E9E9E9
| 541954 ||  || — || March 15, 2012 || Kitt Peak || Spacewatch ||  || align=right | 2.0 km || 
|-id=955 bgcolor=#E9E9E9
| 541955 ||  || — || March 14, 2012 || Haleakala || Pan-STARRS ||  || align=right | 2.5 km || 
|-id=956 bgcolor=#d6d6d6
| 541956 ||  || — || March 13, 2012 || Mount Lemmon || Mount Lemmon Survey ||  || align=right | 2.2 km || 
|-id=957 bgcolor=#E9E9E9
| 541957 ||  || — || March 13, 2012 || Mount Lemmon || Mount Lemmon Survey ||  || align=right | 1.5 km || 
|-id=958 bgcolor=#FA8072
| 541958 ||  || — || March 30, 2008 || Kitt Peak || Spacewatch ||  || align=right | 1.4 km || 
|-id=959 bgcolor=#E9E9E9
| 541959 ||  || — || March 17, 2012 || Catalina || CSS ||  || align=right | 2.1 km || 
|-id=960 bgcolor=#E9E9E9
| 541960 ||  || — || October 1, 2005 || Kitt Peak || Spacewatch ||  || align=right | 1.9 km || 
|-id=961 bgcolor=#E9E9E9
| 541961 ||  || — || November 12, 2010 || Kitt Peak || Spacewatch ||  || align=right | 1.5 km || 
|-id=962 bgcolor=#E9E9E9
| 541962 ||  || — || October 20, 2006 || Mount Lemmon || Mount Lemmon Survey ||  || align=right | 1.0 km || 
|-id=963 bgcolor=#E9E9E9
| 541963 ||  || — || October 30, 2010 || Piszkesteto || Z. Kuli, K. Sárneczky ||  || align=right | 1.8 km || 
|-id=964 bgcolor=#E9E9E9
| 541964 ||  || — || August 26, 2005 || Palomar || NEAT ||  || align=right | 2.5 km || 
|-id=965 bgcolor=#E9E9E9
| 541965 ||  || — || March 20, 2012 || Haleakala || Pan-STARRS ||  || align=right | 1.1 km || 
|-id=966 bgcolor=#E9E9E9
| 541966 ||  || — || February 26, 2012 || Kitt Peak || Spacewatch ||  || align=right | 1.5 km || 
|-id=967 bgcolor=#E9E9E9
| 541967 ||  || — || March 25, 2012 || Mount Lemmon || Mount Lemmon Survey ||  || align=right | 2.1 km || 
|-id=968 bgcolor=#E9E9E9
| 541968 ||  || — || March 13, 2012 || Mount Lemmon || Mount Lemmon Survey ||  || align=right | 1.2 km || 
|-id=969 bgcolor=#E9E9E9
| 541969 ||  || — || September 29, 2005 || Kitt Peak || Spacewatch ||  || align=right | 1.8 km || 
|-id=970 bgcolor=#E9E9E9
| 541970 ||  || — || February 28, 2012 || Haleakala || Pan-STARRS ||  || align=right | 2.0 km || 
|-id=971 bgcolor=#fefefe
| 541971 ||  || — || March 27, 2012 || Mayhill-ISON || ISON || H || align=right data-sort-value="0.48" | 480 m || 
|-id=972 bgcolor=#E9E9E9
| 541972 ||  || — || March 27, 2012 || Mayhill-ISON || ISON ||  || align=right | 1.0 km || 
|-id=973 bgcolor=#d6d6d6
| 541973 ||  || — || December 25, 2011 || Mount Lemmon || Mount Lemmon Survey ||  || align=right | 2.9 km || 
|-id=974 bgcolor=#E9E9E9
| 541974 ||  || — || March 30, 2008 || Kitt Peak || Spacewatch ||  || align=right | 1.3 km || 
|-id=975 bgcolor=#d6d6d6
| 541975 ||  || — || February 28, 2012 || Haleakala || Pan-STARRS ||  || align=right | 2.0 km || 
|-id=976 bgcolor=#E9E9E9
| 541976 ||  || — || February 24, 2012 || Haleakala || Pan-STARRS ||  || align=right | 1.9 km || 
|-id=977 bgcolor=#E9E9E9
| 541977 ||  || — || August 27, 2005 || Palomar || NEAT ||  || align=right | 1.3 km || 
|-id=978 bgcolor=#E9E9E9
| 541978 ||  || — || November 6, 2010 || Catalina || CSS ||  || align=right | 2.1 km || 
|-id=979 bgcolor=#d6d6d6
| 541979 ||  || — || March 22, 2012 || Palomar || PTF ||  || align=right | 2.5 km || 
|-id=980 bgcolor=#E9E9E9
| 541980 ||  || — || February 28, 2012 || Haleakala || Pan-STARRS ||  || align=right | 1.5 km || 
|-id=981 bgcolor=#d6d6d6
| 541981 ||  || — || March 27, 2012 || Mount Lemmon || Mount Lemmon Survey ||  || align=right | 2.1 km || 
|-id=982 bgcolor=#E9E9E9
| 541982 Grendel ||  ||  || March 16, 2012 || Piszkesteto || K. Sárneczky, S. Kürti ||  || align=right data-sort-value="0.94" | 940 m || 
|-id=983 bgcolor=#E9E9E9
| 541983 Matthiaspenselin ||  ||  || April 13, 2012 || Haleakala || Pan-STARRS ||  || align=right | 1.7 km || 
|-id=984 bgcolor=#E9E9E9
| 541984 ||  || — || March 13, 2012 || Kitt Peak || Spacewatch ||  || align=right | 1.2 km || 
|-id=985 bgcolor=#E9E9E9
| 541985 ||  || — || December 6, 2010 || Mount Lemmon || Mount Lemmon Survey ||  || align=right | 2.2 km || 
|-id=986 bgcolor=#d6d6d6
| 541986 ||  || — || March 26, 2007 || Mount Lemmon || Mount Lemmon Survey ||  || align=right | 2.1 km || 
|-id=987 bgcolor=#d6d6d6
| 541987 ||  || — || September 3, 2002 || Palomar || NEAT ||  || align=right | 3.3 km || 
|-id=988 bgcolor=#E9E9E9
| 541988 ||  || — || January 26, 2007 || Kitt Peak || Spacewatch ||  || align=right | 1.6 km || 
|-id=989 bgcolor=#d6d6d6
| 541989 ||  || — || March 26, 1995 || Kitt Peak || Spacewatch ||  || align=right | 2.1 km || 
|-id=990 bgcolor=#E9E9E9
| 541990 ||  || — || March 9, 2003 || Palomar || NEAT ||  || align=right | 1.7 km || 
|-id=991 bgcolor=#E9E9E9
| 541991 ||  || — || September 27, 2009 || Mount Lemmon || Mount Lemmon Survey ||  || align=right | 1.6 km || 
|-id=992 bgcolor=#E9E9E9
| 541992 Lukácsbéla ||  ||  || March 27, 2012 || Piszkesteto || K. Sárneczky ||  || align=right | 2.5 km || 
|-id=993 bgcolor=#d6d6d6
| 541993 ||  || — || February 2, 2006 || Kitt Peak || Spacewatch ||  || align=right | 3.3 km || 
|-id=994 bgcolor=#d6d6d6
| 541994 ||  || — || April 24, 2007 || Mount Lemmon || Mount Lemmon Survey ||  || align=right | 2.4 km || 
|-id=995 bgcolor=#FA8072
| 541995 ||  || — || April 21, 2012 || Mount Lemmon || Mount Lemmon Survey ||  || align=right data-sort-value="0.46" | 460 m || 
|-id=996 bgcolor=#d6d6d6
| 541996 ||  || — || June 24, 2007 || Lulin || LUSS ||  || align=right | 4.1 km || 
|-id=997 bgcolor=#E9E9E9
| 541997 ||  || — || March 27, 2012 || Mayhill-ISON || ISON || ADE || align=right | 1.8 km || 
|-id=998 bgcolor=#E9E9E9
| 541998 ||  || — || April 20, 2012 || Mount Lemmon || Mount Lemmon Survey ||  || align=right | 2.0 km || 
|-id=999 bgcolor=#d6d6d6
| 541999 ||  || — || November 7, 2005 || Mauna Kea || Mauna Kea Obs. ||  || align=right | 2.8 km || 
|-id=000 bgcolor=#d6d6d6
| 542000 ||  || — || April 21, 2012 || Mount Lemmon || Mount Lemmon Survey ||  || align=right | 2.3 km || 
|}

References

External links 
 Discovery Circumstances: Numbered Minor Planets (540001)–(545000) (IAU Minor Planet Center)

0541